= List of Western Sydney Wanderers FC players =

Western Sydney Wanderers FC is an Australian football team who currently play in the A-League, the national domestic association football competition. Colloquially known as Western Sydney, it was founded in 2012 as the tenth member of the then nine-team league. The A-League competition consists of a regular season and a finals series of the top six teams, with the Premiership being awarded to the club who finishes on top of the table in the regular season, and the championship to the winner of the grand final. Winning either of those trophies qualifies a club for the AFC Champions League. In 2014, Football Federation Australia started the FFA Cup, a knock-out cup competition based along the lines of England's FA Cup.

The Wanderers immediately won its first premiership, finishing on top in 2012–13, but they lost the grand final to Central Coast Mariners. They finished second place in 2013–14 and 2015–16, but lost the grand final to respectively Brisbane Roar and Adelaide United. The Wanderers were qualified for the 2014 AFC Champions League due to their premiership and surprisingly won the final against Al-Hilal FC. They also were qualified for the 2014 FIFA Club World Cup, finishing sixth.

This list includes players who have made at least one on-field appearance (either as a starting player or as a substitute) for the Wanderers in a competitive match. Friendly matches are not included. The Wanderers have had several players compete for them who have been capped at international level, before, during or after their time with the team.

== Key ==
- The list is ordered first by date of debut, and then if necessary in alphabetical order.
- Appearances as a substitute are included.
- Statistics are correct up to and including the match played on 12 August 2020. Where a player left the club permanently after this date, his statistics are updated to his date of leaving.

Positions key
GK	Goalkeeper
DF	Defender
MF	Midfielder
FW	Forward

Nationality
Unless otherwise noted, the nationality of a player is determined by the country/countries which he has played for, or if said person has not played international football, their country of birth.
Position
Playing positions are listed according to the tactical formations that were employed at the time.
Club career
Club career is defined as the first and last calendar years in which the player appeared for the club in any of the competitions listed below.
Total appearances and total goals
Total appearances and goals comprise those in the A-League, A-League Finals, FFA Cup, AFC Champions League and the FIFA Club World Cup

== Players ==
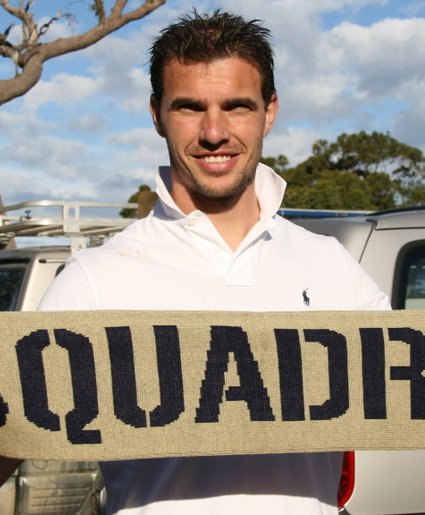
Oldest player Ante Covic made 97 appearances.

Players highlighted in bold are still actively playing at Western Sydney Wanderers.

List of Western Sydney Wanderers players with 25 or more appearances
Player	Nationality	Pos	Club career	Starts	Subs	Total	Goals
Player	Nationality	Pos	Club career	Appearances			Goals
Kwabena Appiah	Australia	–	2012–2015	18	20	38	0
Michael Beauchamp	Australia	–	2012–2014	44	0	44	2
Mark Bridge	Australia	–	2012–2016; 2017–2019	119	22	141	38
Shannon Cole	Australia	–	2012–2017	43	34	77	5
Ante Covic	Australia	–	2012–2015	97	0	97	0
Adam D'Apuzzo	Australia	–	2012–2014	48	1	49	0
Labinot Haliti	Australia	–	2012–2015	46	40	86	10
Youssouf Hersi	Australia	–	2012–2014	44	8	52	8
Dino Kresinger	Australia	–	2012–2013	17	8	25	2
Aaron Mooy	Australia	–	2012–2014	43	11	54	5
Shinji Ono	Japan	–	2012–2014	47	10	57	11
Jérome Polenz	Germany	DF	2012–2014	49	1	50	2
Mateo Poljak	Croatia	–	2012–2015	73	2	75	4
Nikolai Topor-Stanley	Australia	–	2012–2016	125	0	125	4
Tarek Elrich	Australia	–	2012–2013; 2018–2020	38	12	50	2
Jason Trifiro	Australia	–	2012–2015	19	31	50	0
Iacopo La Rocca	Italy	–	2012–2015	70	7	77	8
Tomi Juric	Australia	–	2013–2015	31	20	51	17
Brendon Santalab	Australia	–	2013–2018	47	67	114	41
Matthew Spiranovic	Australia	–	2013–2015	41	3	44	1
Jaushua Sotirio	Australia	–	2013–2019	52	45	97	13
Antony Golec	Australia	–	2014–2015	35	2	37	0
Brendan Hamill	Australia	–	2014–2019	87	16	103	7
Romeo Castelen	Netherlands	–	2014–2016	41	12	53	11
Nikita Rukavytsya	Australia	–	2014–2015	23	5	28	4
Kearyn Baccus	Australia	–	2014–2018	55	27	82	0
Jonathan Aspropotamitis	Australia	–	2015–2018	51	2	53	0
Scott Jamieson	Australia	–	2015–2016	32	0	32	0
Andreu	Spain	–	2015–2016	27	2	29	3
Mitch Nichols	Australia	–	2015–2017	62	1	63	13
Andrew Redmayne	Australia	–	2015–2017	36	1	37	0
Seyi Adeleke	Australia	–	2014–2015	25	0	25	1
Alberto Aguilar	Spain	–	2015–2016	25	0	25	1
Dimas	Spain	FW	2015–2017	54	5	59	6
Scott Neville	Australia	DF	2015–2017	59	0	59	3
Dario Vidošić	Australia	MF	2015–2016	17	12	29	4
Steven Lustica	Australia	MF	2016–2018	22	9	31	3
Lachlan Scott	Australia	FW	2016–2019	14	14	28	5
Jumpei Kusukami	Japan	MF	2016–2018	41	9	50	6
Robert Cornthwaite	Australia	DF	2016–2018	34	1	35	3
Nicolás Martínez	Argentina	MF	2016–2017	25	8	33	4
Jack Clisby	Australia	DF	2016–2018	42	3	45	1
**Keanu Baccus**	Australia	MF	2016–	58	9	67	4
**Vedran Janjetović**	Australia	GK	2017–	72	0	72	0
Roly Bonevacia	Curaçao	MF	2017–2019	50	3	53	10
Oriol Riera	Spain	FW	2017–2019	54	3	57	32
Josh Risdon	Australia	DF	2017–2019	35	0	35	0
Raúl Llorente	Spain	DF	2017–2019	43	3	46	0
**Tass Mourdoukoutas**	Australia	DF	2018–	14	11	25	2
**Bruce Kamau**	Australia	FW	2018–	36	9	45	2
**Patrick Ziegler**	Germany	DF	2018–	27	2	29	1
**Jordan O'Doherty**	Australia	MF	2018–	23	4	27	2
**Tate Russell**	Australia	DF	2018–	22	8	30	2
**Kwame Yeboah**	Australia	FW	2019–	23	9	32	8
Mitchell Duke	Australia	FW	2019–2020	33	4	37	18
**Daniel Georgievski**	Macedonia	DF	2019–	26	0	26	2
**Dylan McGowan**	Australia	DF	2019–	26	0	26	0
Pirmin Schwegler	Australia	MF	2019–2020	22	4	26	2

== Captains ==
Dates	Captain
2012–2014	Michael Beauchamp (AUS)
2014–2016	Nikolai Topor-Stanley (AUS)
2016–2017	Dimas (ESP)
2017–2018	Robert Cornthwaite (AUS)
2018–2019	Brendan Hamill (AUS)
2019–2020	Mitchell Duke (AUS)
2020–	Dylan McGowan (AUS)

== International players ==
Players who have represented their national team at senior level before, during or after playing for the Wanderers.
First Cap column indicates whether their first cap for their respective country came before they joined the club,
during their time at the club or after they left the club. Players in bold are currently at the club. Correct as of 17 March 2018.

Name	Nat	Pos	Years	First Cap	Career total		At Wanderers	
Name	Nat	Pos	Years	First Cap	Apps	Goals	Apps	Goals
Tomi Juric	(Australia)	FW	2013–17	During	31	8	12	2
Matthew Spiranovic	(Australia)	DF	2008–16	Before	34		10	
Aaron Mooy	(Australia)	MF	2012–17	During	31	5	3	3
**Josh Risdon**	(Australia)	DF	2015–17	Before	5		2	
Nikolai Topor-Stanley	(Australia)	DF	2008–14	Before	4		1	
Shinji Ono	(Japan)	MF	1998–08	Before	56	6		
Dario Vidosic	(Australia)	MF	2009–14	Before	23	2		
Michael Beauchamp	(Australia)	DF	2006–10	Before	22	1		
Nikita Rukavytsya	(Australia)	FW	2009–17	Before	16	1		
Romeo Castelen	(Netherlands)	FW	2004–07	Before	10	1		
Robert Cornthwaite	(Australia)	DF	2009–13	Before	8	3		
Mitch Nichols	(Australia)	MF	2009–14	Before	5			
Scott Jamieson	(Australia)	DF	2009–12	Before	4			
Tarek Elrich	(Australia)	DF	2015	After	3			
Terry Antonis	(Australia)	MF	2012	Before	3			
Yojiro Takahagi	(Japan)	MF	2013	Before	2			
Dean Heffernan	(Australia)	DF	2009–10	Before	2	1		
**Mark Bridge**	(Australia)	FW	2008	Before	2			
Ante Covic	(Australia)	GK	2006–08	Before	2			
Shannon Cole	(Australia)	DF	2010	Before	1			
Daniel Mullen	(Australia)	DF	2009	Before	1			

== Notes ==
- Beauchamp was the club captain from 2012 to 2014.
- Topor-Stanley was the club captain from 2014 to 2016.
- Dimas was the club captain from 2016 to 2017.
- Cornthwaite was the club captain from 2017 to 2018.
- Mark Bridge was the club captain from 2018 to 2019
- Mitchell Duke was the club captain from 2019 to 2020
