= 2017–18 Western Sydney Wanderers FC season =

Western Sydney Wanderers
2017–18 season
- Chairman: Paul Lederer
- Manager: Tony Popovic (to 1 October 2017); Hayden Foxe (caretaker) (from 3 October to 1 November 2017); Josep Gombau (from 1 November 2017)
- Stadium: ANZ Stadium & Spotless Stadium, Sydney
- A-League: 7th
- FFA Cup: Semi-finals
- Top goalscorer: League: Oriol Riera (15 goals); All: Oriol Riera (19 goals)
- Highest home attendance: 36,433 vs Sydney FC; 9 December 2017
- Lowest home attendance: 6,612 vs Perth Glory; 4 March 2018
- Average home league attendance: 11,924
Home colours	Away colours

The 2017–18 Western Sydney Wanderers FC season was the club's sixth season since its establishment in 2012. The club participated in the A-League for the sixth time and the FFA Cup for the fourth time.

== Players ==
=== Squad information ===
Note: Flags indicate national team as defined under FIFA eligibility rules; some limited exceptions apply. Players may hold more than one non-FIFA nationality.

No.	Pos.	Nation	Player
3	DF	AUS	Jack Clisby
4	DF	AUS	Josh Risdon
5	DF	AUS	Brendan Hamill
6	MF	ARG	Marcelo Carrusca
7	MF	AUS	Steven Lustica
8	MF	CUW	Roly Bonevacia
9	FW	ESP	Oriol Riera
10	MF	ESP	Álvaro Cejudo
11	FW	AUS	Brendon Santalab
15	MF	AUS	Kearyn Baccus
16	FW	AUS	Jaushua Sotirio
18	MF	AUS	Chris Ikonomidis (on loan from Lazio)

No.	Pos.	Nation	Player
19	FW	AUS	Mark Bridge (Captain)
20	GK	AUS	Vedran Janjetović
21	MF	AUS	Marc Tokich
22	DF	AUS	Jonathan Aspropotamitis
23	FW	AUS	Lachlan Scott
24	DF	ESP	Raúl Llorente
32	FW	AUS	John Roberts (Scholarship)
33	DF	AUS	Michael Thwaite
34	MF	AUS	Kosta Grozos (Scholarship)
40	GK	AUS	Nicholas Suman (Scholarship)
42	MF	AUS	Keanu Baccus
49	FW	AUS	Abraham Majok

=== From youth squad ===
N	Pos.	Nat.	Name	Age	Notes
42	MF	(Australia)	Keanu Baccus	18	
49	FW	(Australia)	Abraham Majok	18	
40	GK	(Australia)	Nicholas Suman	17	1 year scholarship contract
34	MF	(Australia)	Kosta Grozos	17	2 year scholarship contract

=== Transfers in ===
No.	Position	Player	Transferred from	Type/fee	Contract length	Date	Ref
4	DF	Josh Risdon	Perth Glory	Free transfer	2 years	16 May 2017	
8	MF	(Curaçao) Roly Bonevacia	Wellington Phoenix	Free transfer	2 years	16 May 2017	
33	DF	Michael Thwaite		Free transfer	1 year	16 May 2017	
30	GK	John Hall		Injury replacement	6 months	22 May 2017	
9	FW	(Spain) Oriol Riera		Free transfer	2 years	5 July 2017	
21	MF	Marc Tokich	(Australia) FFA Centre of Excellence	Free transfer	2 years	13 July 2017	
25	MF	Chris Herd		Free transfer	2 years	13 July 2017	
19	FW	Mark Bridge		Free transfer	2 years	18 July 2017	
10	MF	(Spain) Álvaro Cejudo		Free transfer	1 year	24 July 2017	
24	DF	(Spain) Raúl Llorente	(Greece) Platanias	Free transfer	1 year	28 August 2017	
32	FW	John Roberts	Melbourne City	Free transfer (2 year scholarship contract)	2 years	4 January 2018	
6	MF	(Argentina) Marcelo Carrusca	Melbourne City	Free transfer	6 months	11 January 2018	
18	MF	Chris Ikonomidis	(Italy) Lazio	Loan	6 months	31 January 2018	

=== Transfers out ===
No.	Position	Player	Transferred to	Type/fee	Date	Ref
21	MF	Mario Shabow	Newcastle Jets	Free transfer	5 April 2017	
12	DF	Scott Neville	Perth Glory	Free transfer	25 April 2017	
2	DF	Shannon Cole		Released	9 May 2017	
6	MF	Mitch Nichols		End of contract	11 May 2017	
8	MF	(Spain) Dimas		End of contract	11 May 2017	
10	MF	(Argentina) Nicolás Martínez	(Greece) Olympiacos	Loan return	11 May 2017	
13	MF	(Uruguay) Bruno Piñatares		End of contract	11 May 2017	
24	MF	Terry Antonis	(Greece) PAOK	Loan return	11 May 2017	
25	FW	Liam Youlley		End of contract	11 May 2017	
27	MF	Emilio Martinez		End of contract	11 May 2017	
28	FW	Stefan Zinni		End of contract	11 May 2017	
29	FW	Ryan Griffiths		End of contract	11 May 2017	
26	MF	Jackson Bandiera		End of contract	14 June 2017	
17	DF	(Spain) Aritz Borda		Mutual contract termination	29 July 2017	
6	MF	Jacob Melling		Mutual contract termination	2 January 2018	
14	MF	(Japan) Jumpei Kusukami		Mutual contract termination	2 January 2018	
30	GK	John Hall		End of contract	9 January 2018	
18	DF	Robert Cornthwaite	(Malaysia) Perak	Mutual contract termination	16 January 2018	
1	GK	Jerrad Tyson		Mutual contract termination	12 April 2018	
25	MF	Chris Herd		Mutual contract termination	12 April 2018	

=== Contract extensions ===
No.	Name	Position	Duration	Date	Notes
1	Jerrad Tyson	Goalkeeper	1 year	8 May 2017	
5	Brendan Hamill	Centre back	2 years	8 May 2017	
15	Kearyn Baccus	Attacking midfielder	2 years	7 June 2017	
20	Vedran Janjetović	Goalkeeper	4 years	11 April 2018	

== Technical staff ==
Position	Name
Head coach	(Spain) Josep Gombau
Assistant coach	(England) Ian Crook
Assistant coach	(Spain) Delfin Ferreres
Goalkeeping coach	(Australia) Davide Del Giovine
Strength & conditioning coach	(Australia) Scott Smith
Physiotherapist	(Australia) Ian Austin

== Statistics ==
=== Squad statistics ===
N	Pos.	Nat.	Name	Total					A-League					FFA Cup
N	Pos.	Nat.	Name	Apps	Goals	Yellow card	Second yellow card	Red card	Apps	Goals	Yellow card	Second yellow card	Red card	Apps	Goals	Yellow card	Second yellow card	Red card
3	DF	(Australia)	Jack Clisby	15	1	4	0	0	9+3	1	2	0	0	3+0	0	2	0	0
4	DF	(Australia)	Josh Risdon	22	0	12	0	0	18+0	0	10	0	0	4+0	0	2	0	0
5	DF	(Australia)	Brendan Hamill	22	3	4	1	0	18+3	3	3	1	0	1+0	0	1	0	0
6	MF	(Argentina)	Marcelo Carrusca	12	1	2	0	0	10+2	1	2	0	0	0+0	0	0	0	0
7	MF	(Australia)	Steven Lustica	19	1	1	0	0	12+4	0	0	0	0	1+2	1	1	0	0
8	MF	(Curaçao)	Roly Bonevacia	26	1	8	0	0	21+1	1	7	0	0	4+0	0	1	0	0
9	FW	(Spain)	Oriol Riera	29	19	6	0	0	23+2	15	4	0	0	4+0	4	2	0	0
10	MF	(Spain)	Álvaro Cejudo	21	2	3	0	0	17+3	2	3	0	0	1+0	0	0	0	0
11	FW	(Australia)	Brendon Santalab	24	4	4	0	0	5+17	3	4	0	0	0+2	1	0	0	0
15	FW	(Australia)	Kearyn Baccus	24	0	3	0	0	15+5	0	1	0	0	4+0	0	2	0	0
16	MF	(Australia)	Jaushua Sotirio	18	3	1	0	0	4+12	3	0	0	0	2+0	0	1	0	0
18	MF	(Australia)	Chris Ikonomidis	10	3	0	0	0	9+1	3	0	0	0	0+0	0	0	0	0
19	FW	(Australia)	Mark Bridge	24	5	4	0	0	18+3	4	4	0	0	0+3	1	0	0	0
20	GK	(Australia)	Vedran Janjetović	31	0	1	0	0	27+0	0	1	0	0	4+0	0	0	0	0
21	MF	(Australia)	Marc Tokich	1	0	0	0	0	0+1	0	0	0	0	0+0	0	0	0	0
22	DF	(Australia)	Jonathan Aspropotamitis	8	0	2	0	0	5+1	0	1	0	0	2+0	0	1	0	0
23	FW	(Australia)	Lachlan Scott	6	0	1	0	0	1+3	0	1	0	0	0+2	0	0	0	0
24	DF	(Spain)	Raúl Llorente	26	0	2	0	0	25+1	0	2	0	0	0+0	0	0	0	0
32	FW	(Australia)	John Roberts	0	0	0	0	0	0+0	0	0	0	0	0+0	0	0	0	0
33	DF	(Australia)	Michael Thwaite	24	1	3	1	0	21+0	1	3	1	0	3+0	0	0	0	0
34	MF	(Australia)	Kosta Grozos	0	0	0	0	0	0+0	0	0	0	0	0+0	0	0	0	0
35	DF	(Australia)	Tass Mourdoukoutas	1	0	0	0	0	0+1	0	0	0	0	0+0	0	0	0	0
40	GK	(Australia)	Nicholas Suman	0	0	0	0	0	0+0	0	0	0	0	0+0	0	0	0	0
42	MF	(Australia)	Keanu Baccus	14	0	1	0	2	11+3	0	1	0	2	0+0	0	0	0	0
47	FW	(Australia)	Matthew Lecce	0	0	0	0	0	0+0	0	0	0	0	0+0	0	0	0	0
49	FW	(Australia)	Abraham Majok	1	0	0	0	0	0+0	0	0	0	0	0+1	0	0	0	0
50	MF	(Australia)	Tariq Maia	0	0	0	0	0	0+0	0	0	0	0	0+0	0	0	0	0
Players no longer at the club:
1	GK	(Australia)	Jerrad Tyson	0	0	0	0	0	0+0	0	0	0	0	0+0	0	0	0	0
6	MF	(Australia)	Jacob Melling	5	0	1	0	0	1+1	0	1	0	0	2+1	0	0	0	0
14	MF	(Japan)	Jumpei Kusukami	15	1	1	0	0	9+2	1	0	0	0	4+0	0	1	0	0
18	DF	(Australia)	Robert Cornthwaite	14	1	5	1	0	11+0	0	5	1	0	3+0	1	0	0	0
25	MF	(Australia)	Chris Herd	12	0	6	0	0	8+1	0	6	0	0	2+1	0	0	0	0
30	GK	(Australia)	John Hall	0	0	0	0	0	0+0	0	0	0	0	0+0	0	0	0	0

- Last updated: 15 April 2018
- Source: au.soccerway.com
- (yellow card) = Number of bookings; (second yellow card) = Number of sending offs after a second yellow card; (red card) = Number of sending offs by a direct red card.

== Pre-season and friendlies ==
15 July 2017 Arsenal Tour	Western Sydney Wanderers (Australia)	1–3	(England) Arsenal	Sydney, Australia
20:00 AEST	Lustica 57'	Report	Giroud 33'; Ramsey 37'; Elneny 44'	Stadium: ANZ Stadium; Attendance: 83,221; Referee: Jarred Gillett (Australia)

9 August 2017	Western Sydney Wanderers (Australia)	4–0	(Australia) Edgeworth FC	Sydney, Australia
19:30 AEST	Lustica 18', 49'; Bridge 77', 86'	Report

18 August 2017	Brisbane Roar (Australia)	0–4	(Australia) Western Sydney Wanderers	Gold Coast, Australia
15:00 AEST		Report	Scott 33'; Sotirio 48', 55'; Majok 60'	Stadium: Cbus Super Stadium; Attendance: 0 (behind closed doors)

23 August 2017	Western Sydney Wanderers (Australia)	2–0	(Australia) Bankstown Berries	Sydney, Australia
	Keanu Baccus 78'; Bridge 86'	Report		Stadium: Leichhardt Oval; Attendance: 0 (behind closed doors)

5 September 2017	Brisbane City (Australia)	1–3	(Australia) Western Sydney Wanderers	Brisbane, Australia
19:30 AEST	Thomas 22'	Report	Scott 14'; Majok 49'; Krousoratis 65'	Stadium: Corporate Travel Management Stadium

9 September 2017	Moreton Bay United (Australia)	0–2	(Australia) Western Sydney Wanderers	Moreton Bay, Australia
17:00 AEST		Report	Riera 29'; Santalab 66'	Stadium: Wolter Park

22 September 2017	Melbourne City (Australia)	1–0	(Australia) Western Sydney Wanderers	Shepparton, Australia
19:30 AEST	Arzani 21' (pen.)	Report		Stadium: McEwen Reserve; Attendance: 2,500; Referee: Jonathan Barreiro

28 September 2017	Western Sydney Wanderers (Australia)	3–0	(Australia) APIA Leichhardt Tigers	Sydney, Australia
19:30 AEST	Bridge 65'; Cejudo 66'; Lustica 81'	Report		Stadium: Marconi Stadium

== Competitions ==
=== Overall ===
Competition	Started round	Final position / round	First match	Last match
A-League	—	7th	8 October 2017	15 April 2018
FFA Cup	Round of 32	Semi-finals	1 August 2017	24 October 2017

=== A-League ===
==== League table ====
Pos	Team	Pld	W	D	L	GF	GA	GD	Pts	Qualification
1	Sydney FC	27	20	4	3	64	22	+42	64	Qualification for 2019 AFC Champions League group stage and Finals series
2	Newcastle Jets	27	15	5	7	57	37	+20	50	Qualification for 2019 AFC Champions League second preliminary round and Finals series
3	Melbourne City	27	13	4	10	41	33	+8	43	Qualification for Finals series
4	Melbourne Victory (C)	27	12	5	10	43	37	+6	41	Qualification for 2019 AFC Champions League group stage and Finals series
5	Adelaide United	27	11	6	10	36	38	−2	39	Qualification for Finals series
6	Brisbane Roar	27	10	5	12	33	40	−7	35	Qualification for Finals series
7	Western Sydney Wanderers	27	8	9	10	38	47	−9	33	
8	Perth Glory	27	10	2	15	37	50	−13	32	
9	Wellington Phoenix (Note: Wellington Phoenix cannot qualify for the AFC Champions League as they are not recognised as an AFC club.)	27	5	6	16	31	55	−24	21	
10	Central Coast Mariners	27	4	8	15	28	49	−21	20	

Source: A-Leagues
Rules for classification: 1) points; 2) goal difference; 3) number of goals scored.
(C) Champions

==== Results summary ====
Overall								Home						Away					
Pld	W	D	L	GF	GA	GD	Pts	W	D	L	GF	GA	GD	W	D	L	GF	GA	GD
27	8	9	10	38	47	−9	33	5	4	4	23	22	+1	3	5	6	15	25	−10

Last updated: 15 April 2018.
Source: ultimatealeague.com

==== Results by round ====
Round	1	2	3	4	5	6	7	8	9	10	11	12	13	14	15	16	17	18	19	20	21	22	23	24	25	26	27
Ground	H	H	A	A	A	A	H	A	H	H	A	A	H	A	H	A	H	A	A	H	A	H	H	A	A	H	H
Result	W	D	D	D	D	D	W	L	L	L	W	L	W	W	D	D	L	L	W	D	L	W	D	L	L	W	L
Position	3	4	4	4	4	4	4\6	7	9	9	8	8	7	6	6	6	7	8	6	6	6	5	6	6	7	6	7

Updated to match(es) played on 15 April 2018. Source: ultimatealeague.com
A = Away; H = Home; W = Win; D = Draw; L = Loss

==== Matches ====
8 October 2017 1	Western Sydney Wanderers	2–1	Perth Glory	Sydney
18:00 AEDT	Riera 43'; Kusukami 45+1'	Report	Hamill 82' (o.g.)	Stadium: Spotless Stadium; Attendance: 12,223; Referee: Daniel Elder

14 October 2017 2	Western Sydney Wanderers	2–2	Central Coast Mariners	Sydney
17:35 AEDT	Riera 39' (pen.); Bonevacia 69'	Report	Asdrúbal 22'; De Silva 63'	Stadium: Spotless Stadium; Attendance: 11,650; Referee: Chris Beath

21 October 2017 3	Sydney FC	2–2	Western Sydney Wanderers	Sydney
19:50 AEDT	Bobô 38' (pen.); Brillante 61'	Report	Riera 3'; Hamill 30'	Stadium: Allianz Stadium; Attendance: 36,057; Referee: Jarred Gillett

29 October 2017 4	Newcastle Jets	1–1	Western Sydney Wanderers	Newcastle
17:00 AEDT	D. Petratos 69'	Report	Bridge 16'	Stadium: McDonald Jones Stadium; Attendance: 11,468; Referee: Chris Beath

6 November 2017 5	Melbourne Victory	1–1	Western Sydney Wanderers	Melbourne
19:50 AEDT	Deng 49'	Report	Riera 32'	Stadium: Etihad Stadium; Attendance: 21,577; Referee: Peter Green

12 November 2017 6	Melbourne City	1–1	Western Sydney Wanderers	Melbourne
19:00 AEDT	McCormack 55' (pen.)	Report	Sotirio 19'	Stadium: AAMI Park; Attendance: 7,516; Referee: Jonathan Barreiro

26 November 2017 8	Adelaide United	2–0	Western Sydney Wanderers	Adelaide
18:30 ACDT	Kitto 45+1', 63'	Report		Stadium: Coopers Stadium; Attendance: 8,210; Referee: Chris Beath

2 December 2017 9	Western Sydney Wanderers	0–2	Brisbane Roar	Sydney
17:35 AEDT		Report	Maccarone 45'; Franjic 66'	Stadium: ANZ Stadium; Attendance: 8,215; Referee: Adam Fielding

9 December 2017 10	Western Sydney Wanderers	0–5	Sydney FC	Sydney
19:50 AEDT		Report	Mierzejewski 14', 45'; Brosque 41'; Scott 53' (o.g.); O'Neill 76'	Stadium: ANZ Stadium; Attendance: 36,433; Referee: Jonathan Barreiro

16 December 2017 11	Central Coast Mariners	0–2	Western Sydney Wanderers	Gosford
19:50 AEDT		Report	Santalab 27'; Cejudo 50'	Stadium: Central Coast Stadium; Attendance: 7,199; Referee: Alex King

22 December 2017 12	Newcastle Jets	4–0	Western Sydney Wanderers	Newcastle
19:50 AEDT	Koutroumbis 11'; Hoffman 60'; Kantarovski 68'; Ugarkovic 84'	Report		Stadium: McDonald Jones Stadium; Attendance: 9,862; Referee: Kris Griffiths-Jones

1 January 2018 13	Western Sydney Wanderers	2–1	Melbourne City	Sydney
19:50 AEDT	Riera 30'; Bridge 32'	Report	McCormack 25'	Stadium: ANZ Stadium; Attendance: 11,628; Referee: Peter Green

5 January 2018 14	Brisbane Roar	0–2	Western Sydney Wanderers	Brisbane
18:50 AEST		Report	Riera 29'; Bridge 45'	Stadium: Suncorp Stadium; Attendance: 11,189; Referee: Shaun Evans

10 January 2018 15	Western Sydney Wanderers	1–1	Adelaide United	Sydney
19:50 AEDT	Clisby 52'	Report	Stamatelopoulos 86'	Stadium: ANZ Stadium; Attendance: 10,771; Referee: Shaun Evans

13 January 2018 16	Wellington Phoenix	1–1	Western Sydney Wanderers	Wellington
19:35 NZDT	Ljujić 75'	Report	Santalab 28'	Stadium: Westpac Stadium; Attendance: 5,634; Referee: Stephen Lucas

19 January 2018 17	Western Sydney Wanderers	0–3	Melbourne Victory	Sydney
19:50 AEDT		Report	Barbarouses 36', 90+2'; Berisha 67'	Stadium: ANZ Stadium; Attendance: 11,864; Referee: Adam Kersey

28 January 2018 18	Perth Glory	3–1	Western Sydney Wanderers	Perth
17:30 AWST	Castro 7' (pen.), 40'; Keogh 43'	Report	Riera 17' (pen.)	Stadium: nib Stadium; Attendance: 9,317; Referee: Jonathan Barreiro

4 February 2018 19	Central Coast Mariners	1–2	Western Sydney Wanderers	Gosford
17:00 AEDT	Skapetis 76'	Report	Sotirio 14'; Riera 30'	Stadium: Central Coast Stadium; Attendance: 7,046

11 February 2018 7	Western Sydney Wanderers	4–0	Wellington Phoenix	Sydney
19:00 AEDT	Riera 6'; Thwaite 63'; Ikonomidis 72'; Sotirio 82'	Report		Stadium: ANZ Stadium; Attendance: 7,127; Referee: Adam Fielding

16 February 2018 20	Western Sydney Wanderers	2–2	Newcastle Jets	Sydney
19:50 AEDT	Riera 7' (pen.), 67' (pen.)	Report	D. Petratos 48'; Nabbout 68'	Stadium: Spotless Stadium; Attendance: 10,065; Referee: Peter Green

25 February 2018 21	Sydney FC	3–1	Western Sydney Wanderers	Sydney
19:00 AEDT	Mierzejewski 44', 55'; Bobô 73'	Report	Riera 10'	Stadium: Allianz Stadium; Attendance: 25,211; Referee: Peter Green

4 March 2018 23	Western Sydney Wanderers	1–1	Perth Glory	Sydney
17:00 AEDT	Bridge 10'	Report	Torres 13'	Stadium: Spotless Stadium; Attendance: 6,612; Referee: Jarred Gillett

10 March 2018 22	Western Sydney Wanderers	4–1	Wellington Phoenix	Sydney
19:50 AEDT	Santalab 40'; Hamill 68', 78'; Ikonomidis 90'	Report	Singh 42'	Stadium: Spotless Stadium; Attendance: 7,041; Referee: Adam Kersey

24 March 2018 24	Melbourne City	3–0	Western Sydney Wanderers	Melbourne
19:50 AEDT	Fornaroli 42'; Jakobsen 57'; Mauk 67'	Report		Stadium: AAMI Park; Attendance: 6,354; Referee: Jarred Gillett

31 March 2018 25	Melbourne Victory	3–1	Western Sydney Wanderers	Melbourne
19:50 AEDT	George 30'; Berisha 45+7'; Deng 51'	Report	Cejudo 45+2'	Stadium: AAMI Park; Attendance: 15,280; Referee: Shaun Evans

7 April 2018 26	Western Sydney Wanderers	3–0	Brisbane Roar	Sydney
17:35 AEDT	Riera 4', 16'; Ikonomidis 40'	Report		Stadium: ANZ Stadium; Attendance: 9,266; Referee: Kurt Ams

15 April 2018 27	Western Sydney Wanderers	2–3	Adelaide United	Sydney
17:00 AEST	Riera 15' (pen.); Carrusca 42'	Report	Diawara 21'; Adlung 39'; Kitto 80'	Stadium: ANZ Stadium; Attendance: 12,122; Referee: Kris Griffiths-Jones

=== FFA Cup ===
1 August 2017 Round of 32	Western Sydney Wanderers (New South Wales)	1–0 (a.e.t.)	(New Zealand) Wellington Phoenix	Sydney
19:30 AEST	Riera 120+1'	Report		Stadium: Campbelltown Stadium; Attendance: 3,189; Referee: Chris Kavanagh

29 August 2017 Round of 16	Bentleigh Greens (Victoria (state))	0–4	(New South Wales) Western Sydney Wanderers	Melbourne
19:30 AEST		Report	Cornthwaite 12'; Riera 53'; Lustica 78'; Bridge 90+3' (pen.)	Stadium: Kingston Heath Soccer Complex; Attendance: 1,634; Referee: Shaun Evans

20 September 2017 Quarter-finals	Blacktown City (New South Wales)	2–2 (a.e.t.) (2–4 p)	(New South Wales) Western Sydney Wanderers	Sydney
19:30 AEST	Andrew 68', 104'	Report	Riera 3' (pen.), 111'	Stadium: Lily's Football Centre; Attendance: 4,217; Referee: Katie Patterson
	Penalties
	Gibbs (penalty missed); Araujo (penalty missed); Lynch (penalty scored); G. Speranza (penalty scored)		(penalty scored) Bridge; (penalty scored) Thwaite; (penalty scored) Lustica; (penalty scored) Riera

24 October 2017 Semi-finals	Western Sydney Wanderers (New South Wales)	1–2	(South Australia) Adelaide United	Sydney
19:30 AEDT	Santalab 70' (pen.)	Report	Absalonsen 13'; Adlung 58'	Stadium: Campbelltown Stadium; Attendance: 5,126; Referee: Peter Green

== See also ==
- 2017–18 Western Sydney Wanderers FC (women) season
