= List of Western Sydney Wanderers FC seasons =

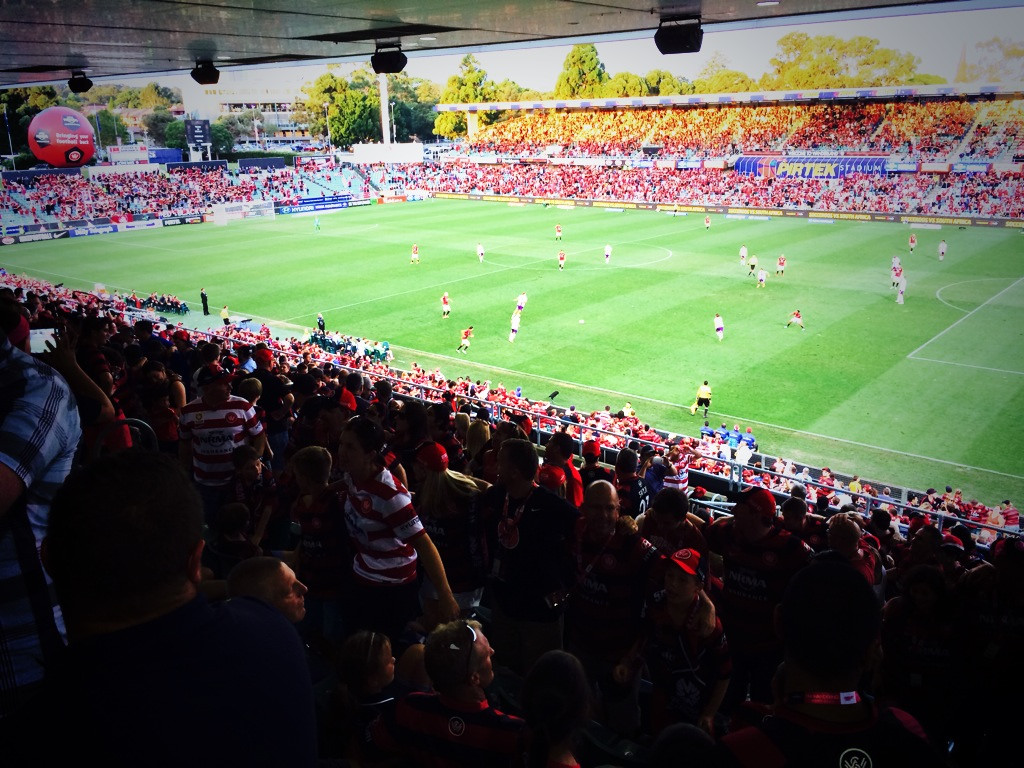
A Wanderers match at Parramatta Stadium

Western Sydney Wanderers Football Club is an Australian professional association football club based in Rooty Hill, New South Wales; the club was formed in 2012. They became the fourth team based in New South Wales, and the second team based in Sydney to compete in the A-League Men.

As of the end of the 2021-22 season, the club have participated in ten seasons in the top division of Australian soccer - the A-League. The club finished their inaugural season in 1st place, winning the Premiership and are the only Australian team to win the AFC Champions League, doing so in 2014. The club has also qualified for the A-League Grand Final in 2013, 2014 and 2016, losing all 3.

== Key ==
Key to league competitions:

- A-League – Australia's top soccer league, established in 2005.
- Finals – The annual postseason elimination tournament for the A-League.
- Australia Cup – Australia's national football knockout cup, established in 2014. Formerly knows as the FFA Cup until the 2021 season.
- AFC Champions League (ACL) – The most prestigious club competition in Asian football; introduced in 1967 as the Asian Champion Club Tournament,
- FIFA Club World Cup (CWC) – A knockout tournament, organised by FIFA encompassing the winners of the respective club competitions in the AFC, CAF, CONCACAF, CONMEBOL, OFC, UEFA along with the host nation.

Key to colours and symbols:

1st or W	Winners
2nd or RU	Runners-up
3rd	Third
♦	A-League Men Golden Boot

Key to league record:

- Season = The year and article of the season
- League = League name
- P = Games played
- W = Games won
- D = Games drawn
- L = Games lost
- GF = Goals scored
- GA = Goals against
- Pts = Points
- Pos = Final position

Key to cup record:

- Dash (-) = Did not qualify
- QR1 = First qualification round
- QR2 = Second qualification round, etc.
- Group = Group stage
- R1 = First round
- R2 = Second round, etc.
- R32 = Round of 32
- R16 = Round of 16
- QF = Quarter-finals
- SF = Semi-finals
- RU = Runners-up
- W = Winners

== Seasons ==
Season	League									Finals	Australia Cup	Other competitions		Top goalscorer(s)		Coach
Season	League	P	W	D	L	GF	GA	Pts	Pos	Finals	Australia Cup	ACL	CWC	Name(s)	Goals	Coach
2012–13	A-League	27	18	3	6	41	21	57	1st	RU	—	—	—	(Australia) Mark Bridge	11	(Australia) Tony Popovic
2013–14	A-League	27	11	9	7	34	29	42	2nd	RU	—	W	—	(Australia) Tomi Juric	8	(Australia) Tony Popovic
2014–15	A-League	27	4	6	17	29	44	18	9th	—	R32	GS	6th	(Australia) Kerem Bulut (Australia) Tomi Juric	6	(Australia) Tony Popovic
2015–16	A-League	27	14	6	7	44	33	48	2nd	RU	QF	—	—	(Australia) Brendon Santalab	11	(Australia) Tony Popovic
2016–17	A-League	27	8	12	7	35	35	36	6th	EF	QF	GS	—	(Australia) Brendon Santalab	16	(Australia) Tony Popovic
2017–18	A-League	27	8	9	10	38	47	33	7th	—	SF	—	—	(Spain) Oriol Riera	19	(Australia) Hayden Foxe (Spain) Josep Gombau
2018–19	A-League	27	6	6	15	42	54	24	8th	—	SF	—	—	(Spain) Oriol Riera	13	(Germany) Markus Babbel
2019–20	A-League	26	9	6	11	35	40	33	9th	—	QF	—	—	(Australia) Mitchell Duke	14	(Germany) Markus Babbel (Australia) Jean-Paul de Marigny
2020–21	A-League	26	9	8	9	45	43	35	8th	—	n/a (Note: Western Sydney did not enter the 2020 FFA Cup due to the event being cancelled following the COVID-19 pandemic in Australia, with only a limited number of preliminary rounds being played.)	—	—	(Australia) Bruce Kamau	9	(Wales) Carl Robinson
2021–22	A-League Men	26	6	9	11	30	38	27	10th	—	R16	—	—	(Israel) Tomer Hemed	6	(Wales) Carl Robinson (Australia) Marko Rudan
2022–23	A-League Men	26	11	8	7	43	27	41	4th	EF	PR	—	—	(Australia) Brandon Borrello	13	(Australia) Marko Rudan
2023–24	A-League Men	27	11	4	12	44	48	37	7th	—	QF	—	—	(Australia) Lachlan Brook	14	(Australia) Marko Rudan
2024–25	A-League Men	26	13	7	6	58	40	46	4th	EF	QF	—	—	(Australia) Nicolas Milanovic	14	(Australia) Alen Stajcic
2025–26	A-League Men	26	5	6	15	27	43	21	12th	—	RO16	—	—	(Bulgaria) Bozhidar Kraev	7	(Australia) Alen Stajcic (Australia) Gary van Egmond
2026–27	A-League Men										RO16	—	—			(Australia) Ufuk Talay

Season	Achievement	Notes
A-League Men
2012–13 A-League	Premiers	—
AFC Champions League
2014 AFC Champions League	Champions	1–0 Agg. v Al-Hilal (Saudi Arabia)
