= 2017–18 A-League =

41st season of top-tier soccer league in Australia

A-League
- Season: 2017–18
- Dates: 6 October 2017 – 5 May 2018
- Champions: Melbourne Victory (4th title)
- Premiers: Sydney FC (3rd title)
- Champions League: Sydney FC; Melbourne Victory; Newcastle Jets
- Matches: 135
- Goals: 398 (2.95 per match)
- Top goalscorer: Bobô (27 goals)
- Biggest home win: Sydney FC 6–0 Perth Glory (30 December 2017)
- Biggest away win: Central Coast Mariners 2–8 Newcastle Jets (14 April 2018)
- Highest scoring: Central Coast Mariners 2–8 Newcastle Jets (14 April 2018)
- Longest winning run: Sydney FC (7 games)
- Longest unbeaten run: Sydney FC (15 games)
- Longest winless run: Central Coast Mariners (11 games)
- Longest losing run: Central Coast Mariners (6 games)
- Highest attendance: 36,433; Western Sydney Wanderers vs. Sydney FC (9 December 2017)
- Lowest attendance: 4,312; Wellington Phoenix vs. Melbourne City (14 April 2018)
- Average attendance: 10,671 ( 1,623)

The 2017–18 A-League was the 41st season of top-flight soccer in Australia, and the 13th since the establishment of the A-League in 2004. The season began on 6 October 2017 and ended with the Grand Final on 5 May 2018.

Sydney FC won the A-League minor premiership, while Melbourne Victory won the Championship after defeating the Newcastle Jets 1–0 in the Grand Final on 5 May 2018; this marked the first time in A-League history in which the Championship was won by a team which finished outside the top 2.

== Clubs ==

Team	City	Home Ground	Capacity
Adelaide United	Adelaide	Coopers Stadium; Adelaide Oval	17,000; 53,583
Brisbane Roar	Brisbane	Suncorp Stadium	52,500
Central Coast Mariners	Gosford	Central Coast Stadium	20,119
Melbourne City	Melbourne	AAMI Park	30,050
Melbourne Victory	Melbourne	Etihad Stadium; AAMI Park	56,347; 30,050
Newcastle Jets	Newcastle	McDonald Jones Stadium	33,000
Perth Glory	Perth	nib Stadium	20,500
Sydney FC	Sydney	Allianz Stadium	45,500
Wellington Phoenix	Wellington	Westpac Stadium	34,500
Western Sydney Wanderers	Sydney	ANZ Stadium; Spotless Stadium	84,000; 24,000

=== Personnel and kits ===
Team	Manager	Captain	Kit manufacturer	Kit sponsor
Adelaide United	(Germany) Marco Kurz	(Spain) Isaías	Macron	IGA
Brisbane Roar	(Australia) John Aloisi	(Australia) Matt McKay	Umbro	Central Home Loans
Central Coast Mariners	(Republic of Ireland) Wayne O'Sullivan	(Spain) Alan Baró	Umbro	Masterfoods
Melbourne City	(England) Warren Joyce	(Denmark) Michael Jakobsen	Nike	Etihad Airways
Melbourne Victory	(Australia) Kevin Muscat	(Australia) Carl Valeri	Adidas	Optislim & Optivite
Newcastle Jets	(Scotland) Ernie Merrick	(Australia) Nigel Boogaard	Viva Sports	Ledman Group
Perth Glory	(England) Kenny Lowe	(Republic of Ireland) Andy Keogh	Macron	QBE Insurance
Sydney FC	(Australia) Graham Arnold	(Australia) Alex Brosque	Puma	The Star
Wellington Phoenix	(England) Chris Greenacre	(New Zealand) Andrew Durante	Adidas	Huawei; Century 21
Western Sydney Wanderers	(Spain) Josep Gombau	(Australia) Mark Bridge	Nike	NRMA Insurance

=== Managerial changes ===
Team	Outgoing manager	Manner of departure	Date of vacancy	Position on table	Incoming manager	Date of appointment
Newcastle Jets	(Australia) Mark Jones	Sacked	16 April 2017	Pre-season	(Scotland) Ernie Merrick	9 May 2017
Adelaide United	(Spain) Guillermo Amor	Resigned	10 May 2017	Pre-season	(Germany) Marco Kurz	16 June 2017
Melbourne City	(Australia) Michael Valkanis	End of contract	10 May 2017	Pre-season	(England) Warren Joyce	19 June 2017
Wellington Phoenix	(England) Des Buckingham	End of contract	19 May 2017	Pre-season	(Bosnia and Herzegovina) Darije Kalezić	7 June 2017
Western Sydney Wanderers	(Australia) Tony Popovic	Resigned	1 October 2017	Pre-season	(Australia) Hayden Foxe (caretaker)	3 October 2017
Western Sydney Wanderers	(Australia) Hayden Foxe (caretaker)	End of caretaker spell	1 November 2017	4th	(Spain) Josep Gombau	1 November 2017
Wellington Phoenix	(Bosnia and Herzegovina) Darije Kalezić	Sacked	7 March 2018	10th	(England) Chris Greenacre (caretaker)	7 March 2018
Central Coast Mariners	(Australia) Paul Okon	Resigned	20 March 2018	9th	(Republic of Ireland) Wayne O'Sullivan (caretaker)	20 March 2018

=== Foreign players ===
Club	Visa 1	Visa 2	Visa 3	Visa 4	Visa 5	Non-Visa foreigner(s)	Former player(s)
Adelaide United	(Denmark) Johan Absalonsen	(Germany) Daniel Adlung	(Senegal) Baba Diawara	(Slovenia) Džengis Čavušević	(Spain) Isaías	(Burundi) Pacifique Niyongabire^{2} (Turkey) Ersan Gülüm^{2}	(Algeria) Karim Matmour
Brisbane Roar	(Denmark) Thomas Kristensen	(France) Éric Bauthéac	(Italy) Massimo Maccarone	(Tunisia) Fahid Ben Khalfallah		(Brazil) Henrique^{1} (England) Jamie Young^{2} (Greece) Avraam Papadopoulos^{2} (New Zealand) Dane Ingham^{2} (Sri Lanka) Jack Hingert^{2}	
Central Coast Mariners	(Netherlands) Wout Brama	(Netherlands) Tom Hiariej	(Spain) Alan Baró			(New Zealand) Storm Roux^{2}	(New Zealand) Kwabena Appiah^{2} (Spain) Asdrúbal
Melbourne City	(Denmark) Michael Jakobsen	(Netherlands) Bart Schenkeveld	(Poland) Marcin Budziński	(Uruguay) Bruno Fornaroli		(Italy) Iacopo La Rocca^{1} (Malta) Manny Muscat^{2}	(Argentina) Fernando Brandán (Argentina) Marcelo Carrusca^{1} (Scotland) Ross McCormack
Melbourne Victory	(Argentina) Matías Sánchez	(Kosovo) Besart Berisha	(Netherlands) Leroy George	(New Zealand) Kosta Barbarouses		(New Zealand) Jai Ingham^{2} (South Sudan) Kenny Athiu^{2}	
Newcastle Jets	(England) Wayne Brown	(Republic of Ireland) Roy O'Donovan	(Venezuela) Ronald Vargas			(Argentina) Patito Rodríguez^{3} (Croatia) Ivan Vujica^{2} (North Macedonia) Daniel Georgievski^{2} (New Zealand) Glen Moss^{2}	
Perth Glory	(England) Joseph Mills	(Republic of Ireland) Andy Keogh	(Spain) Andreu	(Spain) Diego Castro	(Spain) Xavi Torres		
Sydney FC	(Brazil) Bobô	(Netherlands) Jordy Buijs	(Poland) Adrian Mierzejewski	(Serbia) Miloš Ninković	(Portugal) Fábio Ferreira		
Wellington Phoenix	(Croatia) Goran Paracki	(Fiji) Roy Krishna	(Italy) Marco Rossi	(Serbia) Andrija Kaluđerović	(Serbia) Matija Ljujić		(Brazil) Guilherme Finkler (Iraq) Ali Abbas^{1}
Western Sydney Wanderers	(Curaçao) Roly Bonevacia	(Spain) Álvaro Cejudo	(Spain) Raúl Llorente	(Spain) Oriol Riera		(Argentina) Marcelo Carrusca^{1}	(Japan) Jumpei Kusukami

The following do not fill a Visa position:
^{1}Those players who were born and started their professional career abroad but have since gained Australian citizenship (and New Zealand citizenship, in the case of Wellington Phoenix);
^{2}Australian citizens (and New Zealand citizens, in the case of Wellington Phoenix) who have chosen to represent another national team;
^{3}Injury Replacement Players, or National Team Replacement Players;
^{4}Guest Players (eligible to play a maximum of fourteen games)

=== Salary cap exemptions and captains ===
Club	First Marquee	Second Marquee	Mature Age Rookie	Captain	Vice-Captain
Adelaide United	(Senegal) Baba Diawara	None	None	(Spain) Isaías	(Australia) Jordan Elsey
Brisbane Roar	(Australia) Brett Holman	(Italy) Massimo Maccarone	(Australia) Brendan White	(Australia) Matt McKay	(Australia) Jade North
Central Coast Mariners	(Australia) Daniel De Silva	None	None	(Spain) Alan Baró	None
Melbourne City	(Uruguay) Bruno Fornaroli	(Poland) Marcin Budziński	None	(Denmark) Michael Jakobsen	None
Melbourne Victory	(Kosovo) Besart Berisha	None	None	(Australia) Carl Valeri	(Australia) Leigh Broxham
Newcastle Jets	(Venezuela) Ronald Vargas	None	None	(Australia) Nigel Boogaard	None
Perth Glory	(Spain) Diego Castro	None	None	(Republic of Ireland) Andy Keogh	None
Sydney FC	(Brazil) Bobô	(Serbia) Miloš Ninković	None	(Australia) Alex Brosque	(Australia) Alex Wilkinson
Wellington Phoenix	None	None	None	(New Zealand) Andrew Durante	None
Western Sydney Wanderers	(Spain) Oriol Riera	(Spain) Álvaro Cejudo	None	(Australia) Mark Bridge	None

== Regular season ==
=== League table ===
Pos	Team	Pld	W	D	L	GF	GA	GD	Pts	Qualification
1	Sydney FC	27	20	4	3	64	22	+42	64	Qualification for 2019 AFC Champions League group stage and Finals series
2	Newcastle Jets	27	15	5	7	57	37	+20	50	Qualification for 2019 AFC Champions League second preliminary round and Finals series
3	Melbourne City	27	13	4	10	41	33	+8	43	Qualification for Finals series
4	Melbourne Victory (C)	27	12	5	10	43	37	+6	41	Qualification for 2019 AFC Champions League group stage and Finals series
5	Adelaide United	27	11	6	10	36	38	−2	39	Qualification for Finals series
6	Brisbane Roar	27	10	5	12	33	40	−7	35	Qualification for Finals series
7	Western Sydney Wanderers	27	8	9	10	38	47	−9	33	
8	Perth Glory	27	10	2	15	37	50	−13	32	
9	Wellington Phoenix (Note: Wellington Phoenix cannot qualify for the AFC Champions League as they are not recognised as an AFC club.)	27	5	6	16	31	55	−24	21	
10	Central Coast Mariners	27	4	8	15	28	49	−21	20	

Source: A-Leagues
Rules for classification: 1) points; 2) goal difference; 3) number of goals scored.
(C) Champions

=== Results ===
Home \ Away	ADE	BRI	CCM	MCY	MVC	NEW	PER	SYD	WEL	WSW	ADE	BRI	CCM	MCY	MVC	NEW	PER	SYD	WEL	WSW
Adelaide United		1–2	1–0	0–2	2–2	1–2	2–1	0–1	3–1	2–0			2–2	1–1		5–2		0–0		
Brisbane Roar	1–2		0–0	3–1	1–2	1–2	1–2	0–3	0–0	0–2	1–0		1–0	1–2		0–1	3–2			
Central Coast Mariners	1–2	1–2		2–2	1–1	1–5	1–0	2–0	0–0	0–2						2–8		1–2	1–0	1–2
Melbourne City	5–0	2–0	1–0		0–1	2–2	1–3	0–1	1–0	1–1			1–0		1–2			0–4	2–1	3–0
Melbourne Victory	1–2	1–1	1–1	1–2		2–1	3–2	0–1	2–1	1–1	3–0	1–2	5–2					1–3		3–1
Newcastle Jets	2–1	1–0	2–0	1–2	4–1		2–2	2–1	3–0	1–1				0–3	2–0		0–2		2–3	2–2
Perth Glory	1–0	2–3	2–1	0–2	0–2	1–2		2–3	1–0	3–1	0–3		3–1	2–1	1–0					
Sydney FC	3–0	3–1	1–1	3–1	1–0	2–1	2–0		3–2	2–2		1–2				2–2	6–0		4–0	3–1
Wellington Phoenix	1–1	3–3	1–4	2–1	2–3	0–1	5–2	1–4		1–1	0–1	2–2			2–1		2–1			
Western Sydney Wanderers	1–1	0–2	2–2	2–1	0–3	2–2	2–1	0–5	4–0		2–3	3–0					1–1		4–1	

Updated to match(es) played on 15 April 2018. Source: aleague.com.au
Legend: Blue = home team win; Yellow = draw; Red = away team win.

== Finals series ==
Elimination-finals
Melbourne Victory	2
Adelaide United	1
Melbourne City	2
Brisbane Roar	0

Semi-finals
Sydney FC	2
Melbourne Victory (a.e.t.)	3
Newcastle Jets	2
Melbourne City	1

Grand Final
Newcastle Jets	0
Melbourne Victory	1

=== Elimination-finals ===
20 April 2018	Melbourne City	2−0	Brisbane Roar	Melbourne
19:50 AEST	Mauk 59'; Fitzgerald 90+1'	Report		Stadium: AAMI Park; Attendance: 7,757; Referee: Jarred Gillett

22 April 2018	Melbourne Victory	2−1	Adelaide United	Melbourne
18:00 AEST	George 63'; Berisha 89'	Report	Mileusnic 57'	Stadium: AAMI Park; Attendance: 15,502; Referee: Chris Beath

=== Semi-finals ===
27 April 2018	Newcastle Jets	2−1	Melbourne City	Newcastle
19:50 AEST	McGree 56'; Hoffman 74'	Report	Topor-Stanley 13' (o.g.)	Stadium: McDonald Jones Stadium; Attendance: 19,131; Referee: Shaun Evans

28 April 2018	Sydney FC	2–3 (a.e.t.)	Melbourne Victory	Sydney
19:50 AEST	Nigro 24' (o.g.); Antonis 90+5' (o.g.)	Report	Barbarouses 31'; Troisi 47'; Antonis 117'	Stadium: Allianz Stadium; Attendance: 17,775; Referee: Kurt Ams

=== Grand Final ===
5 May 2018	Newcastle Jets	0−1	Melbourne Victory	Newcastle
19:50 AEST		Report	Barbarouses 9'	Stadium: McDonald Jones Stadium; Attendance: 29,410; Referee: Jarred Gillett

== Statistics ==
=== Attendances ===
==== By club ====
These are the attendance records of each of the teams at the end of the home and away season. The table does not include finals series attendances.

As of matches played on 15 April 2018.

Team	Hosted	Average	High	Low	Total
Melbourne Victory	14	17,631	35,792	8,370	246,832
Sydney FC	14	14,593	34,810	9,110	204,304
Western Sydney Wanderers	13	11,924	36,433	6,612	155,017
Newcastle Jets	14	11,016	18,156	6,258	154,218
Melbourne City	14	9,868	22,515	5,207	138,158
Adelaide United	13	9,830	19,416	7,021	127,790
Perth Glory	13	9,186	13,565	7,277	119,419
Brisbane Roar	14	9,093	11,485	5,192	127,299
Central Coast Mariners	13	7,194	12,044	4,973	93,525
Wellington Phoenix	13	5,694	8,154	4,312	74,022
League total	135	10,671	36,433	4,312	1,440,584

==== By round ====
2017–18 A-League Attendance
Round	Total	Games	Avg. Per Game
Round 1	66,814	5	13,363
Round 2	86,537	5	17,307
Round 3	85,558	5	17,118
Round 4	45,757	5	9,151
Round 5	61,403	5	12,281
Round 6	48,008	5	9,602
Round 7	46,569	5	9,314
Round 8	39,323	5	7,865
Round 9	37,224	5	7,445
Round 10	73,636	5	14,727
Round 11	44,008	5	8,802
Round 12	55,153	5	11,031
Round 13	59,479	5	11,896
Round 14	51,890	5	10,378
Round 15	44,845	5	8,969
Round 16	48,325	5	9,665
Round 17	50,613	5	10,123
Round 18	50,514	5	10,103
Round 19	45,865	5	9,173
Round 20	46,316	5	9,263
Round 21	59,729	5	11,946
Round 22	60,794	5	12,159
Round 23	43,918	5	8,784
Round 24	33,053	5	6,611
Round 25	58,202	5	11,640
Round 26	47,837	5	9,567
Round 27	49,184	5	9,837
Elimination Final	23,259	2	11,630
Semi Final	36,906	2	18,453
Grand Final	29,410	1	29,410

=== Club membership ===
2017–18 A-League membership figures
Club	Members
Adelaide United	6,906
Brisbane Roar	9,345
Central Coast Mariners	7,124
Melbourne City	11,255
Melbourne Victory	26,095
Newcastle Jets	9,195
Perth Glory	9,368
Sydney FC	14,834
Wellington Phoenix	5,289
Western Sydney Wanderers	19,007
Total	118,418
Average	11,841

Last updated: 15 April 2018.
Source: a-league.com.au

=== Player stats ===
==== Top scorers ====
As of matches played on 15 April 2018

Rank	Player	Club	Goals
1	(Brazil) Bobô	Sydney FC	27
2	(Spain) Oriol Riera	Western Sydney Wanderers	15
3	(Scotland) Ross McCormack	Melbourne City	14
4	(Kosovo) Besart Berisha	Melbourne Victory	13
4	(Poland) Adrian Mierzejewski	Sydney FC	13
6	(Australia) Andrew Nabbout	Newcastle Jets	10
6	(Australia) Dimitri Petratos	Newcastle Jets	10
8	(Serbia) Andrija Kaluđerović	Wellington Phoenix	9
8	(Italy) Massimo Maccarone	Brisbane Roar	9
8	(Republic of Ireland) Roy O'Donovan	Newcastle Jets	9
8	(Australia) Dario Vidošić	Wellington Phoenix; Melbourne City	9

==== Hat-tricks ====
Player	For	Against	Result	Date	Ref
(Republic of Ireland) Roy O'Donovan	Newcastle Jets	Central Coast Mariners	5–1	7 October 2017	
(Brazil) Bobô	Sydney FC	Wellington Phoenix	1–4	23 December 2017	
(Brazil) Bobô	Sydney FC	Perth Glory	6–0	30 December 2017	
(Kosovo) Besart Berisha	Melbourne Victory	Central Coast Mariners	5–2	18 March 2018	
(Australia) Riley McGree	Newcastle Jets	Central Coast Mariners	2–8	14 April 2018	

==== Own goals ====
As of matches played on 15 April 2018

Player	Club	Against	Round
(Australia) Thomas Deng	Melbourne Victory	Sydney FC	1
(Australia) Brendan Hamill	Western Sydney Wanderers	Perth Glory	1
(Australia) Nigel Boogaard	Newcastle Jets	Brisbane Roar	3
(Serbia) Andrija Kaluđerović	Wellington Phoenix	Central Coast Mariners	8
(Croatia) Goran Paracki	Wellington Phoenix	Melbourne Victory	9
(Australia) Lachlan Scott	Western Sydney Wanderers	Sydney FC	10
(Australia) Jeremy Walker	Perth Glory	Newcastle Jets	10
(Australia) Mark Milligan	Melbourne Victory	Wellington Phoenix	15
(Australia) Dino Djulbic	Perth Glory	Adelaide United	19
(Australia) Shane Lowry	Perth Glory	Wellington Phoenix	20
(Australia) Ryan Strain	Adelaide United	Central Coast Mariners	20
(Australia) Taylor Regan	Adelaide United	Melbourne Victory	21
(Australia) Leigh Broxham	Melbourne Victory	Wellington Phoenix	26
(Australia) Jacob Pepper	Brisbane Roar	Perth Glory	27

==== Clean sheets ====
As of matches played on 15 April 2018

Rank	Player	Club	Clean sheets
1	(Australia) Andrew Redmayne	Sydney FC	12
2	(Australia) Dean Bouzanis	Melbourne City	6
3	(Australia) Ben Kennedy	Central Coast Mariners	5
3	(England) Jamie Young	Brisbane Roar	5
5	(Australia) Jack Duncan	Newcastle Jets	4
5	(Australia) Vedran Janjetović	Western Sydney Wanderers	4
5	(Australia) Liam Reddy	Perth Glory	4
8	(Australia) Eugene Galekovic	Melbourne City	3
8	(Australia) Paul Izzo	Adelaide United	3
8	(New Zealand) Glen Moss	Newcastle Jets	3
8	(Australia) Lawrence Thomas	Melbourne Victory	3

=== Discipline ===
During the season each club is given fair play points based on the number of cards they received in games. A yellow card is worth 1 point, a second yellow card is worth 2 points, and a red card is worth 3 points. At the annual awards night, the club with the fewest points wins the Fair Play Award.

Club	Yellow card	Second yellow card	Red card	FP Pts
Sydney FC	38	0	1	41
Newcastle Jets	51	1	1	56
Wellington Phoenix	54	0	1	57
Melbourne City	44	2	3	57
Perth Glory	59	0	1	62
Adelaide United	51	2	3	64
Central Coast Mariners	50	3	3	65
Melbourne Victory	53	2	3	66
Brisbane Roar	62	0	2	68
Western Sydney Wanderers	61	3	2	73
League total	523	13	20	

Last updated: 15 April 2018.
Source: ultimatealeague.com

== Awards ==
The following end of the season awards were announced at the 2017–18 Dolan Warren Awards night on 30 April 2018.

- Johnny Warren Medal – Adrian Mierzejewski, Sydney FC
- NAB Young Footballer of the Year – Daniel Arzani, Melbourne City
- Nike Golden Boot Award – Bobô, Sydney FC (27 goals)
- Goalkeeper of the Year – Jamie Young, Brisbane Roar
- Coach of the Year – Graham Arnold, Sydney FC
- Fair Play Award – Sydney FC
- Referee of the Year – Jarred Gillett
- Goal of the Year – Andrew Nabbout, Newcastle Jets (Western Sydney Wanderers v Newcastle Jets, 16 February 2018)

== See also ==
- 2017–18 Adelaide United FC season
- 2017–18 Brisbane Roar FC season
- 2017–18 Central Coast Mariners FC season
- 2017–18 Melbourne City FC season
- 2017–18 Melbourne Victory FC season
- 2017–18 Newcastle Jets FC season
- 2017–18 Perth Glory FC season
- 2017–18 Sydney FC season
- 2017–18 Wellington Phoenix FC season
- 2017–18 Western Sydney Wanderers FC season
