= 2016–17 Western Sydney Wanderers FC season =

Western Sydney Wanderers
2016–17 season
- Chairman: Paul Lederer
- Manager: Tony Popovic
- Stadium: ANZ Stadium & Spotless Stadium, Sydney
- A-League: 6th
- A-League Finals Series: Elimination-finals
- FFA Cup: Quarter-finals
- AFC Champions League: Group stage
- Top goalscorer: League: Brendon Santalab (14 goals); All: Brendon Santalab (16 goals)
- Highest home attendance: 61,880 vs Sydney FC; 8 October 2016
- Lowest home attendance: 8,965 vs Adelaide United; 4 March 2017
- Average home league attendance: 17,746
Home colours	Away colours

The 2016–17 Western Sydney Wanderers FC season was the club's fifth season since its establishment in 2012. The club participated in the A-League for the fifth time, the FFA Cup for the third time and the AFC Champions League for the third time.

== Players ==
=== Squad information ===
Note: Flags indicate national team as defined under FIFA eligibility rules; some limited exceptions apply. Players may hold more than one non-FIFA nationality.

No.	Pos.	Nation	Player
1	GK	AUS	Jerrad Tyson
2	DF	AUS	Shannon Cole
3	DF	AUS	Jack Clisby
5	DF	AUS	Brendan Hamill
6	MF	AUS	Mitch Nichols (vice-captain)
7	MF	AUS	Steven Lustica
8	MF	ESP	Dimas (captain)
10	MF	ARG	Nicolás Martínez (on loan from Olympiacos)
11	FW	AUS	Brendon Santalab
12	DF	AUS	Scott Neville
13	MF	URU	Bruno Piñatares
14	MF	JPN	Jumpei Kusukami
15	MF	AUS	Kearyn Baccus
16	FW	AUS	Jaushua Sotirio

No.	Pos.	Nation	Player
17	DF	ESP	Aritz Borda
18	DF	AUS	Robert Cornthwaite
19	MF	AUS	Jacob Melling
20	GK	AUS	Vedran Janjetović
21	MF	AUS	Mario Shabow
22	DF	AUS	Jonathan Aspropotamitis
23	FW	AUS	Lachlan Scott
24	MF	AUS	Terry Antonis (on loan from PAOK)
25	FW	AUS	Liam Youlley
26	MF	AUS	Jackson Bandiera
27	MF	AUS	Emilio Martinez
28	FW	AUS	Stefan Zinni
29	FW	AUS	Ryan Griffiths

=== From youth squad ===
N	Pos.	Nat.	Name	Age	Notes
21	MF	(Australia)	Mario Shabow	18	
23	FW	(Australia)	Lachlan Scott	19	

=== Transfers in ===
No.	Pos.	Nat.	Name	Age	Moving from	Type	Transfer window	Ends	Transfer fee	Source
1	GK	(Australia)	Jerrad Tyson	26		Transfer	Pre-season	2017	Free	
7	MF	(Australia)	Steven Lustica	25		Transfer	Pre-season	2018	Free	
13	MF	(Uruguay)	Bruno Piñatares	26	Cerro (Uruguay)	Transfer	Pre-season	2017	Free	
17	DF	(Spain)	Aritz Borda	31	Alavés (Spain)	Transfer	Pre-season	2018	Free	
14	MF	(Japan)	Jumpei Kusukami	28	Sagan Tosu (Japan)	Transfer	Pre-season	2017	Free	
18	DF	(Australia)	Robert Cornthwaite	30		Transfer	Pre-season	2018	Free	
3	DF	(Australia)	Jack Clisby	24	Melbourne City	Transfer	Pre-season	2018	Free	
19	MF	(Australia)	Jacob Melling	21	Melbourne City	Transfer	Pre-season	2018	Free	
9	FW	(Australia)	Kerem Bulut	24		Transfer	Pre-season	2018	Free	
10	MF	(Argentina)	Nicolás Martínez	28	Olympiacos (Greece)	Loan	Pre-season	2017	Free	
27	MF	(Australia)	Emilio Martinez	18	Nike Academy (England)	Transfer	Pre-season	2017	Free	
20	GK	(Australia)	Vedran Janjetović	29	Sydney FC	Transfer	Mid-Season	2018	Free	
24	MF	(Australia)	Terry Antonis	23	PAOK (Greece)	Loan	Mid-Season	2017	Free	
29	FW	(Australia)	Ryan Griffiths	35	South China (Hong Kong)	Transfer	Mid-Season	2017		
28	FW	(Australia)	Stefan Zinni	20	South Melbourne	Transfer	Mid-Season	2017		

=== Transfers out ===
No.	Pos.	Nat.	Name	Age	Moving to	Type	Transfer window	Transfer fee	Source
17	MF	(Spain)	Alberto	31		Released	Pre-season		
18	MF	(Spain)	Andreu	32		Released	Pre-season		
7	FW	(Netherlands)	Romeo Castelen	33		Released	Pre-season		
14	FW	(Australia)	Golgol Mebrahtu	25		Released	Pre-season		
9	FW	(Italy)	Federico Piovaccari	31		Released	Pre-season		
13	MF	(Australia)	Matt Sim	28		Released	Pre-season		
30	GK	(Australia)	Liam Reddy	34		Released	Pre-season		
33	FW	(Australia)	Josh Macdonald	20	Wollongong Wolves	Transfer	Pre-season	Free	
19	FW	(Australia)	Mark Bridge	30	Chiangrai United (Thailand)	Transfer	Pre-season		
23	DF	(Australia)	Shayne D'Cunha	20		Released	Pre-season		
31	MF	(Australia)	Alusine Fofanah	18		Released	Pre-season		
32	DF	(Australia)	Daniel Alessi	18	Newcastle Jets	Transfer	Pre-season		
10	MF	(Australia)	Dario Vidošić	29	Liaoning Whowin (China)	Transfer	Pre-season		
21	MF	(Australia)	Jacob Pepper	24		Released	Pre-season		
3	DF	(Australia)	Scott Jamieson	27	IFK Göteborg (Sweden)	Transfer	Pre-season		
4	DF	(Australia)	Nikolai Topor-Stanley	31	Hatta Club (United Arab Emirates)	Transfer	Mid-season		
9	FW	(Australia)	Kerem Bulut	24		Released	Mid-season		
20	GK	(Australia)	Andrew Redmayne	27	Sydney FC	Transfer	Mid-season		

=== Contract extensions ===
Name	Position	Duration	Contract Expiry	Notes
(Australia) Jaushua Sotirio	Winger	2 years	2019	
(Australia) Lachlan Scott	Forward	2 years	2019	

== Technical staff ==
Position	Name
Head coach	(Australia) Tony Popovic
Assistant coach	(Spain) Andrés Carrasco
Assistant coach	(Australia) Hayden Foxe
Goalkeeping coach	(Australia) Zeljko Kalac
Strength & conditioning coach	(Australia) Scott Smith
Physiotherapist	(Australia) Ian Austin

== Statistics ==
=== Squad statistics ===
N	Pos.	Nat.	Name	Total					A-League					FFA Cup					AFC Champions League
N	Pos.	Nat.	Name	Apps	Goals	Yellow card	Second yellow card	Red card	Apps	Goals	Yellow card	Second yellow card	Red card	Apps	Goals	Yellow card	Second yellow card	Red card	Apps	Goals	Yellow card	Second yellow card	Red card
1	GK	(Australia)	Jerrad Tyson	7	0	0	0	1	6	0	0	0	1	0	0	0	0	0	1	0	0	0	0
2	DF	(Australia)	Shannon Cole	10	0	1	0	0	2+1	0	0	0	0	0+3	0	0	0	0	3+1	0	1	0	0
3	DF	(Australia)	Jack Clisby	30	0	8	0	0	25	0	6	0	0	0	0	0	0	0	5	0	2	0	0
5	DF	(Australia)	Brendan Hamill	22	1	2	0	0	6+8	0	0	0	0	3	1	0	0	0	4+1	0	2	0	0
6	MF	(Australia)	Mitch Nichols	31	3	2	0	0	24	1	2	0	0	3	1	0	0	0	3+1	1	0	0	0
7	MF	(Australia)	Steven Lustica	12	2	1	0	0	4+3	1	0	0	0	3	0	0	0	0	2	1	1	0	0
8	MF	(Spain)	Dimas	31	4	9	0	0	20+4	3	9	0	0	3	1	0	0	0	3+1	0	0	0	0
10	MF	(Argentina)	Nicolás Martínez	33	4	2	0	0	22+5	4	2	0	0	0	0	0	0	0	3+3	0	0	0	0
11	FW	(Australia)	Brendon Santalab	26	16	8	1	0	12+9	14	8	1	0	0+2	2	0	0	0	1+2	0	0	0	0
12	DF	(Australia)	Scott Neville	30	2	7	1	0	23	0	5	1	0	3	2	0	0	0	4	0	2	0	0
13	MF	(Uruguay)	Bruno Piñatares	21	1	3	0	0	12+7	1	2	0	0	1+1	0	1	0	0	0	0	0	0	0
14	MF	(Japan)	Jumpei Kusukami	35	5	1	0	0	22+5	3	1	0	0	2	0	0	0	0	4+2	2	0	0	0
15	MF	(Australia)	Kearyn Baccus	35	0	9	0	0	18+8	0	6	0	0	2+1	0	2	0	0	6	0	1	0	0
16	FW	(Australia)	Jaushua Sotirio	26	5	4	1	0	10+11	3	3	1	0	1	0	0	0	0	3+1	2	1	0	0
17	DF	(Spain)	Aritz Borda	20	1	3	0	2	14	1	3	0	2	1	0	0	0	0	5	0	0	0	0
18	DF	(Australia)	Robert Cornthwaite	21	2	2	0	0	18+1	2	1	0	0	0	0	0	0	0	2	0	1	0	0
19	MF	(Australia)	Jacob Melling	1	0	0	0	0	0+1	0	0	0	0	0	0	0	0	0	0	0	0	0	0
20	GK	(Australia)	Vedran Janjetović	20	0	2	0	0	15	0	1	0	0	0	0	0	0	0	5	0	1	0	0
21	MF	(Australia)	Mario Shabow	2	0	1	0	0	0+1	0	0	0	0	0	0	0	0	0	0+1	0	1	0	0
22	DF	(Australia)	Jonathan Aspropotamitis	31	0	3	0	0	24	0	3	0	0	2+1	0	0	0	0	4	0	0	0	0
23	FW	(Australia)	Lachlan Scott	22	5	2	0	0	8+8	1	1	0	0	2	2	1	0	0	3+1	2	0	0	0
24	MF	(Australia)	Terry Antonis	14	3	2	0	0	10+1	1	1	0	0	0	0	0	0	0	3	2	1	0	0
25	FW	(Australia)	Liam Youlley	0	0	0	0	0	0	0	0	0	0	0	0	0	0	0	0	0	0	0	0
26	MF	(Australia)	Jackson Bandiera	0	0	0	0	0	0	0	0	0	0	0	0	0	0	0	0	0	0	0	0
27	MF	(Australia)	Emilio Martinez	0	0	0	0	0	0	0	0	0	0	0	0	0	0	0	0	0	0	0	0
28	FW	(Australia)	Stefan Zinni	2	0	0	0	0	0+2	0	0	0	0	0	0	0	0	0	0	0	0	0	0
29	FW	(Australia)	Ryan Griffiths	7	0	0	0	0	1+4	0	0	0	0	0	0	0	0	0	1+1	0	0	0	0
40	GK	(Australia)	Nicholas Suman	0	0	0	0	0	0	0	0	0	0	0	0	0	0	0	0	0	0	0	0
42	MF	(Australia)	Keanu Baccus	3	0	1	0	0	0+2	0	1	0	0	0	0	0	0	0	0+1	0	0	0	0
49	FW	(Australia)	Abraham Majok	3	0	0	0	0	0+1	0	0	0	0	0	0	0	0	0	1+1	0	0	0	0
Players no longer at the club:
4	DF	(Australia)	Nikolai Topor-Stanley	3	0	0	0	1	0	0	0	0	0	3	0	0	0	1	0	0	0	0	0
9	FW	(Australia)	Kerem Bulut	7	0	3	0	0	5+1	0	3	0	0	1	0	0	0	0	0	0	0	0	0
20	GK	(Australia)	Andrew Redmayne	11	0	1	0	0	7+1	0	1	0	0	3	0	0	0	0	0	0	0	0	0

- Last updated: 10 May 2017
- Source: au.soccerway.com
- (yellow card) = Number of bookings; (second yellow card) = Number of sending offs after a second yellow card; (red card) = Number of sending offs by a direct red card.

== Pre-season and friendlies ==
29 July 2016	Brisbane Roar (Australia)	1–2	(Australia) Western Sydney Wanderers	Gold Coast, Australia
15:00 AEST	Broich 54'	Report	Shabow 17'; Sotirio 26'	Stadium: Cbus Super Stadium; Attendance: 0 (behind closed doors); Referee: Alex King

17 August 2016	Canberra FC (Australia)	1–4	(Australia) Western Sydney Wanderers	Canberra, Australia
19:00 AEST	James 55'	Report	Cole 67' (pen.); Scott (?); Nichols (?); Melling (?)	Stadium: Deakin Stadium

8 September 2016 Japan tour	Kokushikan University (Japan)	1–3	(Australia) Western Sydney Wanderers	Tokyo, Japan
	Goal	Report	Bulut 18'; Santalab 70', 73'

12 September 2016 Japan tour	JEF Chiba (Japan)	0–3	(Australia) Western Sydney Wanderers	Chiba, Japan
		Report	Bulut 2'; Nichols 18'; Lustica 60'	Stadium: United Park

24 September 2016	Newcastle Jets (Australia)	2–0	(Australia) Western Sydney Wanderers	Cessnock, Australia
15:00 AEST	Hoole 22'; Nabbout 41'	Report		Stadium: Cessnock Sportsground; Attendance: 2,132; Referee: Katie Patterson

== Competitions ==
=== Overall ===
Competition	Started round	Final position / round	First match	Last match
A-League	—	6th	8 October 2016	15 April 2017
A-League Finals	Elimination-finals	Elimination-finals	21 April 2017	21 April 2017
FFA Cup	Round of 32	Quarter-finals	2 August 2016	21 September 2016
AFC Champions League	Group stage	Group stage	21 February 2017	10 May 2017

=== A-League ===
==== League table ====
Pos	Team	Pld	W	D	L	GF	GA	GD	Pts	Qualification
1	Sydney FC (C)	27	20	6	1	55	12	+43	66	Qualification for 2018 AFC Champions League group stage and Finals series
2	Melbourne Victory	27	15	4	8	49	31	+18	49	Qualification for 2018 AFC Champions League group stage and Finals series
3	Brisbane Roar	27	11	9	7	43	37	+6	42	Qualification for 2018 AFC Champions League second preliminary round and Finals series
4	Melbourne City	27	11	6	10	49	44	+5	39	Qualification for Finals series
5	Perth Glory	27	10	9	8	53	53	0	39	Qualification for Finals series
6	Western Sydney Wanderers	27	8	12	7	35	35	0	36	Qualification for Finals series
7	Wellington Phoenix (Note: Wellington Phoenix cannot qualify for the AFC Champions League as they are not recognised as an AFC club.)	27	8	6	13	41	46	−5	30	
8	Central Coast Mariners	27	6	5	16	31	52	−21	23	
9	Adelaide United	27	5	8	14	25	46	−21	23	
10	Newcastle Jets	27	5	7	15	28	53	−25	22	

Source: A-Leagues
Rules for classification: 1) points; 2) goal difference; 3) number of goals scored.
(C) Champions

==== Results summary ====
Overall								Home						Away					
Pld	W	D	L	GF	GA	GD	Pts	W	D	L	GF	GA	GD	W	D	L	GF	GA	GD
27	8	12	7	35	35	0	36	4	7	3	15	17	−2	4	5	4	20	18	+2

Last updated: 15 April 2017.
Source: ultimatealeague.com

==== Results by round ====
Round	1	2	3	4	5	6	7	8	9	10	11	12	13	14	15	16	17	18	19	20	21	22	23	24	25	26	27
Ground	H	A	H	H	A	A	H	H	A	H	A	A	H	A	A	H	A	A	H	H	A	H	H	H	A	H	A
Result	L	W	D	D	D	L	D	D	W	L	D	D	D	L	D	W	L	W	L	W	L	D	W	W	W	D	D
Position	10	5	6	7	6	7	6	7	6	6	7	7	6	7	8	7	8	6	7	6	6	6	6	6	5	6	6

Updated to match(es) played on 16 April 2017. Source: ultimatealeague.com
A = Away; H = Home; W = Win; D = Draw; L = Loss

==== Matches ====
8 October 2016 1	Western Sydney Wanderers	0–4	Sydney FC	Sydney
19:50 AEDT		Report	Hološko 51'; Bobô 55'; O'Neill 85'; Brosque 89'	Stadium: ANZ Stadium; Attendance: 61,880; Referee: Jarred Gillett

14 October 2016 2	Adelaide United	1–2	Western Sydney Wanderers	Adelaide
19:20 ACDT	Henrique 43'	Report	Santalab 67', 90+2'	Stadium: Coopers Stadium; Attendance: 14,789; Referee: Shaun Evans

23 October 2016 3	Western Sydney Wanderers	2–2	Newcastle Jets	Sydney
19:00 AEDT	Borda 24'; Dimas 45+2' (pen.)	Report	Boogaard 82'; Hoole 88'	Stadium: Spotless Stadium; Attendance: 13,247; Referee: Chris Beath

29 October 2016 4	Western Sydney Wanderers	1–1	Central Coast Mariners	Sydney
19:50 AEDT	Santalab 2'	Report	Berry 61'	Stadium: Spotless Stadium; Attendance: 12,168; Referee: Shaun Evans

6 November 2016 5	Perth Glory	2–2	Western Sydney Wanderers	Perth
16:00 AWST	Grant 5'; Keogh 51'	Report	N. Martínez 1'; Santalab 67'	Stadium: nib Stadium; Attendance: 13,290; Referee: Kurt Ams

12 November 2016 6	Melbourne Victory	3–0	Western Sydney Wanderers	Melbourne
19:50 AEDT	Bozanic 26'; J. Ingham 65'; Beister 85'	Report		Stadium: Etihad Stadium; Attendance: 21,480; Referee: Jarred Gillett

18 November 2016 7	Western Sydney Wanderers	1–1	Melbourne City	Sydney
19:50 AEDT	Kilkenny 90+2' (o.g.)	Report	Cahill 55'	Stadium: Spotless Stadium; Attendance: 14,232; Referee: Chris Beath

25 November 2016 8	Western Sydney Wanderers	1–1	Brisbane Roar	Sydney
19:50 AEDT	Kusukami 56'	Report	Maclaren 18' (pen.)	Stadium: Spotless Stadium; Attendance: 11,201; Referee: Adam Fielding

3 December 2016 9	Central Coast Mariners	1–4	Western Sydney Wanderers	Gosford
17:35 AEDT	Powell 5'	Report	Kusukami 6'; N. Martínez 31'; McGing 50' (o.g.); Santalab 87'	Stadium: Central Coast Stadium; Attendance: 11,075; Referee: Kris Griffiths-Jones

10 December 2016 10	Western Sydney Wanderers	0–3	Melbourne Victory	Sydney
19:50 AEDT		Report	Berisha 32', 66', 82'	Stadium: ANZ Stadium; Attendance: 16,231; Referee: Chris Beath

17 December 2016 11	Wellington Phoenix	2–2	Western Sydney Wanderers	Auckland
15:35 NZDT	Finkler 62' (pen.); Krishna 68'	Report	Santalab 20'; Nichols 56'	Stadium: Mount Smart Stadium; Attendance: 5,702; Referee: Peter Green

23 December 2016 12	Brisbane Roar	1–1	Western Sydney Wanderers	Brisbane
18:50 AEST	C. Brown 52'	Report	Dimas 69'	Stadium: Suncorp Stadium; Attendance: 13,110; Referee: Kris Griffiths-Jones

1 January 2017 13	Western Sydney Wanderers	1–1	Perth Glory	Sydney
19:50 AEDT	Sotirio 66'	Report	Taggart 16'	Stadium: ANZ Stadium; Attendance: 12,203; Referee: Jarred Gillett

6 January 2017 14	Melbourne City	1–0	Western Sydney Wanderers	Melbourne
19:50 AEDT	Franjic 19'	Report		Stadium: AAMI Park; Attendance: 10,731; Referee: Alan Milliner

14 January 2017 15	Sydney FC	0–0	Western Sydney Wanderers	Sydney
19:50 AEDT		Report		Stadium: Allianz Stadium; Attendance: 40,143; Referee: Peter Green

22 January 2017 16	Western Sydney Wanderers	2–0	Newcastle Jets	Sydney
17:00 AEST	Scott 44'; Sotirio 68'	Report		Stadium: Campbelltown Stadium; Attendance: 9,477; Referee: Matthew Conger

28 January 2017 17	Brisbane Roar	2–1	Western Sydney Wanderers	Brisbane
18:50 AEST	Borrello 22'; Holman 90+3'	Report	Kusukami 32'	Stadium: Suncorp Stadium; Attendance: 13,058; Referee: Chris Beath

4 February 2017 18	Wellington Phoenix	1–3	Western Sydney Wanderers	New Plymouth
19:35 NZDT	Smeltz 71'	Report	Santalab 21', 65'; N. Martínez 58'	Stadium: Yarrow Stadium; Attendance: 5,185; Referee: Adam Fielding

12 February 2017 19	Western Sydney Wanderers	0–2	Central Coast Mariners	Sydney
17:00 AEDT		Report	O'Donovan 65' (pen.), 78'	Stadium: Spotless Stadium; Attendance: 9,618; Referee: Kris Griffiths-Jones

18 February 2017 20	Western Sydney Wanderers	1–0	Sydney FC	Sydney
19:50 AEDT	Santalab 26'	Report		Stadium: ANZ Stadium; Attendance: 44,843; Referee: Chris Beath

25 February 2017 21	Perth Glory	2–0	Western Sydney Wanderers	Perth
19:00 AWST	Harold 45+2'; Chianese 90+4'	Report		Stadium: nib Stadium; Attendance: 9,789; Referee: Jonathan Barreiro

4 March 2017 22	Western Sydney Wanderers	0–0	Adelaide United	Sydney
19:50 AEDT		Report		Stadium: Spotless Stadium; Attendance: 8,965; Referee: Kris Griffiths-Jones

19 March 2017 23	Western Sydney Wanderers	3–1	Wellington Phoenix	Sydney
19:00 AEDT	N. Martínez 9'; Santalab 40', 48'	Report	Finkler 76'	Stadium: Spotless Stadium; Attendance: 7,828; Referee: Daniel Elder

24 March 2017 24	Western Sydney Wanderers	3–1	Melbourne City	Sydney
19:50 AEDT	Santalab 22', 64', 68'	Report	Kilkenny 3'	Stadium: Spotless Stadium; Attendance: 10,204; Referee: Jarred Gillett

1 April 2017 25	Newcastle Jets	0–3	Western Sydney Wanderers	Newcastle
17:35 AEDT		Report	Cornthwaite 40', 50'; Sotirio 42'	Stadium: McDonald Jones Stadium; Attendance: 9,380; Referee: Shaun Evans

8 April 2017 26	Western Sydney Wanderers	0–0	Melbourne Victory	Sydney
18:50 AEST		Report		Stadium: ANZ Stadium; Attendance: 16,345; Referee: Peter Green

15 April 2017 27	Adelaide United	2–2	Western Sydney Wanderers	Adelaide
19:20 ACST	Carrusca 10' (pen.); McGowan 38'	Report	Dimas 63'; Lustica 74'	Stadium: Coopers Stadium; Attendance: 7,636; Referee: Chris Beath

==== Finals series ====
21 April 2017 Elimination-final	Brisbane Roar	1–1 (a.e.t.) (6–5 p)	Western Sydney Wanderers	Brisbane
19:50 AEST	Maclaren 55'	Report	Antonis 45+2' (pen.)	Stadium: Suncorp Stadium; Attendance: 17,530; Referee: Jarred Gillett
	Penalties
	Borrello (penalty scored); D'Agostino (penalty scored); Maclaren (penalty scored); DeVere (penalty scored); Kristensen (penalty scored); Oar (penalty scored)		(penalty scored) Antonis; (penalty scored) Dimas; (penalty scored) N. Martínez; (penalty scored) Hamill; (penalty scored) Cornthwaite; (penalty missed) Kusukami

=== FFA Cup ===
2 August 2016 Round of 32	Western Sydney Wanderers (New South Wales)	3–2	(New Zealand) Wellington Phoenix	Sydney
20:00 AEST	Scott 40', 48'; Nichols 70'	Report	Watson 9'; Barbarouses 31'	Stadium: Campbelltown Stadium; Attendance: 3,212; Referee: Stephen Lucas

30 August 2016 Round of 16	Edgeworth FC (New South Wales)	1–5	(New South Wales) Western Sydney Wanderers	Newcastle
20:00 AEST	McBreen 59'	Report	Neville 35', 48'; Hamill 45+1'; Santalab 84', 90'	Stadium: Magic Park; Attendance: 2,616; Referee: Alan Milliner

21 September 2016 Quarter-final	Melbourne City (Victoria (state))	4–1	(New South Wales) Western Sydney Wanderers	Melbourne
19:30 AEST	Jakobsen 2'; Fornaroli 32'; Cahill 45' (pen.); Brandán 65'	Report	Dimas 73'	Stadium: AAMI Park; Attendance: 5,401; Referee: Jarred Gillett

=== AFC Champions League ===
==== Group stage ====
Pos	Team	Pld	W	D	L	GF	GA	GD	Pts	Qualification
1	(Japan) Urawa Red Diamonds	6	4	0	2	18	7	+11	12 (Note: Head-to-head results: Shanghai SIPG 3–2 Urawa Red Diamonds, Urawa Red Diamonds 1–0 Shanghai SIPG (Urawa Red Diamonds won on away goals).)	Advance to knockout stage
2	(China) Shanghai SIPG	6	4	0	2	15	9	+6	12	Advance to knockout stage
3	(South Korea) FC Seoul	6	2	0	4	10	15	−5	6 (Note: Head-to-head results: FC Seoul 2–3 Western Sydney Wanderers, Western Sydney Wanderers 2–3 FC Seoul (tied on head-to-head results, ranked on total goal difference).)	
4	(Australia) Western Sydney Wanderers	6	2	0	4	10	22	−12	6	

Source: AFC
Rules for classification: Group stage tiebreakers
Notes:

21 February 2017 1	Western Sydney Wanderers (Australia)	0–4	(Japan) Urawa Red Diamonds	Sydney, Australia
20:00 AEDT		Report	Koroki 56'; Lee 58'; Makino 68'; Rafael Silva 86'	Stadium: Campbelltown Stadium; Attendance: 5,590; Referee: Ravshan Irmatov (Uzbekistan)

28 February 2017 2	Shanghai SIPG (China)	5–1	(Australia) Western Sydney Wanderers	Shanghai, China
19:30 CST	Hulk 2'; Oscar 17'; K. Shi 25'; Elkeson 27'; Wu Lei 75'	Report	Nichols 20'	Stadium: Shanghai Stadium; Attendance: 28,090; Referee: Ahmed Al-Kaf (Oman)

15 March 2017 3	FC Seoul (South Korea)	2–3	(Australia) Western Sydney Wanderers	Seoul, South Korea
19:30 KST	I.L. Yun 66', 71'	Report	Scott 24'; Antonis 40' (pen.); Sotirio 63'	Stadium: Seoul World Cup Stadium; Attendance: 4,769; Referee: Ammar Al-Jeneibi (United Arab Emirates)

11 April 2017 4	Western Sydney Wanderers (Australia)	2–3	(South Korea) FC Seoul	Sydney, Australia
20:00 AEST	Antonis 77'; Scott 90+2'	Report	Se.H. Lee 4'; Dejan 42', 71'	Stadium: Campbelltown Stadium; Attendance: 5,356; Referee: Nivon Robesh Gamini (Sri Lanka

26 April 2017 5	Urawa Red Diamonds (Japan)	6–1	(Australia) Western Sydney Wanderers	Saitama, Japan
19:30 JST	Sekine 14'; Ljubijankić 18'; Lee 43'; Rafael Silva 71', 80'; Koroki 90+4'	Report	Kusukami 66'	Stadium: Saitama Stadium 2002; Attendance: 19,467; Referee: Khamis Al-Marri (Qatar)

10 May 2017 6	Western Sydney Wanderers (Australia)	3–2	(China) Shanghai SIPG	Sydney, Australia
20:00 AEST	Kusukami 3'; Lustica 6'; Sotirio 89'	Report	Wu Lei 1'; Elkeson 23' (pen.)	Stadium: Campbelltown Stadium; Attendance: 5,271; Referee: Turki Al-Khudhayr (Saudi Arabia)
