= Stefan Zinni =

Australian soccer player

Personal information
- Full name: Stefan Marc Zinni
- Date of birth: 6 July 1996 (age 30)
- Place of birth: Australia
- Position: Winger

Team information
- Current team: Preston Lions

Youth career
- 2003–2013: South Melbourne
- 2013–2016: Melbourne City

Senior career*
Years	Team	Apps	(Gls)
2015–2016	Melbourne City NPL	38	(7)
2015–2016	Melbourne City	4	(0)
2016–2017	South Melbourne	0	(0)
2017	Western Sydney Wanderers	2	(0)
2017–2018	South Melbourne	15	(0)
2018–	Avondale	133	(48)
2020–2021	→ Western United (loan)	0	(0)
2026–	Preston Lions	8	(3)
- * Club domestic league appearances and goals as of 18 May 2026

Stefan Zinni (born 6 July 1996) is an Australian professional footballer who plays as a winger for Preston Lions. He has previously played for Melbourne City, Western Sydney Wanderers, and Western United in the A-League.

== Club career ==
=== Melbourne City ===
On 26 August 2015, he made his professional senior debut for Melbourne City in the 2015 FFA Cup against Wellington Phoenix. On 10 October 2015, he made his A-league debut against Sydney FC at Allianz Stadium.

=== South Melbourne ===
On 18 December 2016, Zinni signed with South Melbourne where he played 10 years in his youth.

=== Western Sydney Wanderers ===
On 1 February, Zinni was signed by Western Sydney Wanderers until the end of the season to help bolster their attack.

=== Western United ===
On 28 December 2020, Zinni was signed by Western United on a 2-month injury replacement deal.
