= Brendan Hamill (soccer) =

Australian soccer player

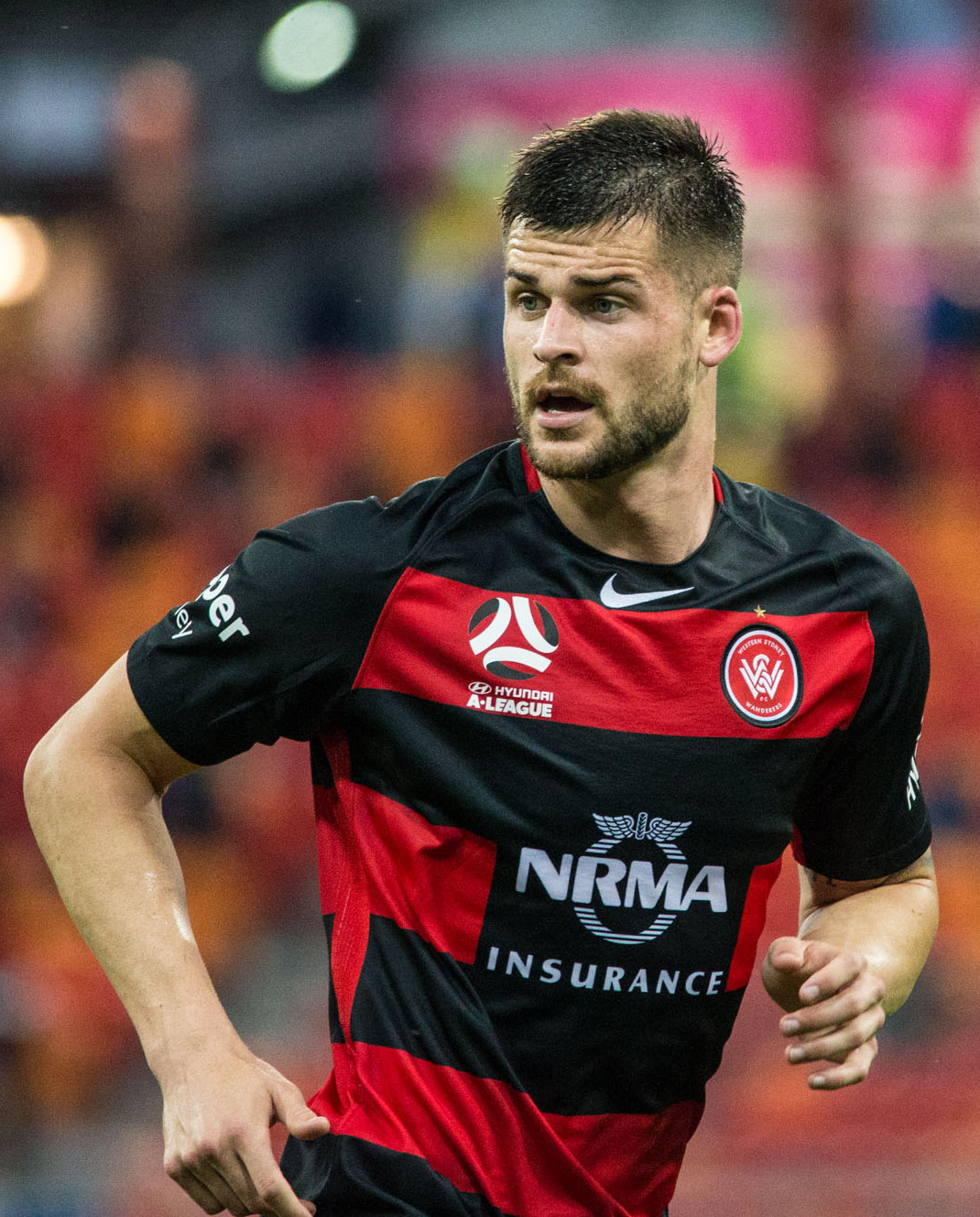
- Hamill with WSW in 2017

Personal information
- Full name: Brendan Michael Hamill
- Date of birth: 18 September 1992 (age 34)
- Place of birth: Sydney, Australia
- Height: 1.85 m (6 ft 1 in)
- Position: Centre-back

Team information
- Current team: Melbourne Victory
- Number: 5

Youth career
- Marconi Stallions
- Parramatta Eagles
- Sydney Wanderers
- 2008–2009: NSWIS
- 2009–2010: AIS

Senior career*
Years	Team	Apps	(Gls)
2010–2012	Melbourne Heart	35	(1)
2012–2014	Seongnam	8	(1)
2013	→ Gangwon (loan)	0	(0)
2014–2019	Western Sydney Wanderers	80	(4)
2019–2021	Western United	20	(0)
2021–2022	Melbourne Victory	19	(3)
2022–2024	Mohun Bagan	34	(1)
2024–	Melbourne Victory	27	(1)

International career^{‡}
2007–2009	Australia U17	16	(4)
2009–2011	Australia U20	14	(1)
2011–2012	Australia U23	1	(0)
Medal record
Representing Australia
Men's Association football
AFC U-20 Asian Cup
Runner-up	2010 China
- * Club domestic league appearances and goals as of 14 June 2025 ‡ National team caps and goals as of 18 March 2016

Brendan Michael Hamill (born 18 September 1992) is an Australian professional footballer who plays as a defender for Melbourne Victory.

== Club career ==
Hamill played for the Australian Institute of Sport in the 2009–10 A-League National Youth League where they failed to win a single game. Hamill was selected for the 'Come Play XI' which was thrown together in order to play a friendly against Melbourne Victory as a testimonial game for Kevin Muscat.

=== Melbourne Heart ===
On 23 April 2010 Hamill rejected numerous offers from English Premier League clubs to sign his first professional contract with Melbourne Heart along with fellow U-20 players, Kliment Taseski and Eli Babalj. On 5 August 2010, he became the youngest player to play for Heart, at 17 years and 321 days old.

=== Seongnam Ilhwa Chunma ===
On 16 July 2012, Hamill joined K-League side Seongnam.

=== Western Sydney Wanderers ===
On 26 June 2014, Hamill signed for Western Sydney Wanderers.

=== Western United ===
On 15 May 2019, after rejecting a contract extension from Western Sydney Wanderers, Hamill signed for new A-League club Western United.

=== Melbourne Victory ===
In July 2021, after playing 20 games over two seasons with Western United, Hamill re-united with coach Tony Popovic, joining Melbourne Victory on a two-year deal.

=== Mohun Bagan SG ===
On 23 June 2022, Indian Super League club Mohun Bagan SG announce the signing of Brendan Hamill on a two-year deal. He made his debut for the club as substitute on 20 August against Rajasthan United at the 131st edition of Durand Cup; his team lost the match by 3–2.

== International career ==
In 2009 Hamill was called up to the Australian U-20 squad for the 2010 AFC U-19 Championship qualification as a replacement for the injured Trent Sainsbury.

On 7 March 2011 he was selected to represent the Australia Olympic football team in an Asian Olympic Qualifier match against Iraq.

== Career statistics ==
As of 25 November 2021

Appearances and goals by club, season and competition
Club	Season	League			Cup		Continental		Total	
Club	Season	Division	Apps	Goals	Apps	Goals	Apps	Goals	Apps	Goals
Melbourne Heart	2010–11	A-League Men	12	0	0	0	0	0	12	0
Melbourne Heart	2011–12	A-League Men	23	1	0	0	0	0	23	1
Melbourne Heart	Heart total		35	1	0	0	0	0	35	1
Seongnam	2012	K League Classic	8	1	0	0	0	0	8	1
Seongnam	2013	K League Classic	0	0	0	0	0	0	0	0
Seongnam	2014	K League Classic	0	0	0	0	0	0	0	0
Seongnam	Seongnam total		8	1	0	0	0	0	8	1
Gangwon (loan)	2013	K League Classic	0	0	0	0	0	0	0	0
Western Sydney Wanderers	2014–15	A-League Men	15	0	0	0	7	0	22	0
Western Sydney Wanderers	2015–16	A-League Men	6	0	2	1	0	0	8	1
Western Sydney Wanderers	2016–17	A-League Men	14	0	3	1	5	0	22	1
Western Sydney Wanderers	2017–18	A-League Men	21	3	1	0	0	0	22	3
Western Sydney Wanderers	2018–19	A-League Men	22	1	4	1	0	0	26	2
Western Sydney Wanderers	Wanderers total		78	4	10	3	12	0	100	7
Western United	2019–20	A-League Men	5	0	0	0	0	0	5	0
Western United	2020–21	A-League Men	15	0	0	0	0	0	15	0
Western United	Western United total		20	0	0	0	0	0	20	0
Melbourne Victory	2021–22	A-League Men	19	3	0	0	0	0	19	3
Mohun Bagan	2022–23	Indian Super League	20	0	1	0	2 (Note: 1 Appearance in AFC Cup and Indian club qualifiers for 2023–24 AFC competitions each)	0	23	0
Mohun Bagan	2023–24	Indian Super League	6	1	4	0	6	0	16	1
Mohun Bagan	Mohun Bagan total		26	1	5	0	8	0	39	1
Career total			186	10	11	3	14	0	211	13

== Honours ==
=== Mohun Bagan ===
- Indian Super League Shield: 2023-24
- Durand Cup: 2023
- ISL Cup: 2022–23

Western Sydney Wanderers

- AFC Champions League: 2014

Melbourne Victory

- FFA Cup: 2021

Australia U-20

- AFC U-20 Asian Cup: runner-up 2010
- AFF U-19 Youth Championship: 2010

Australia U16

- AFF U-16 Youth Championship: 2008
