= Raúl Llorente =

Spanish footballer

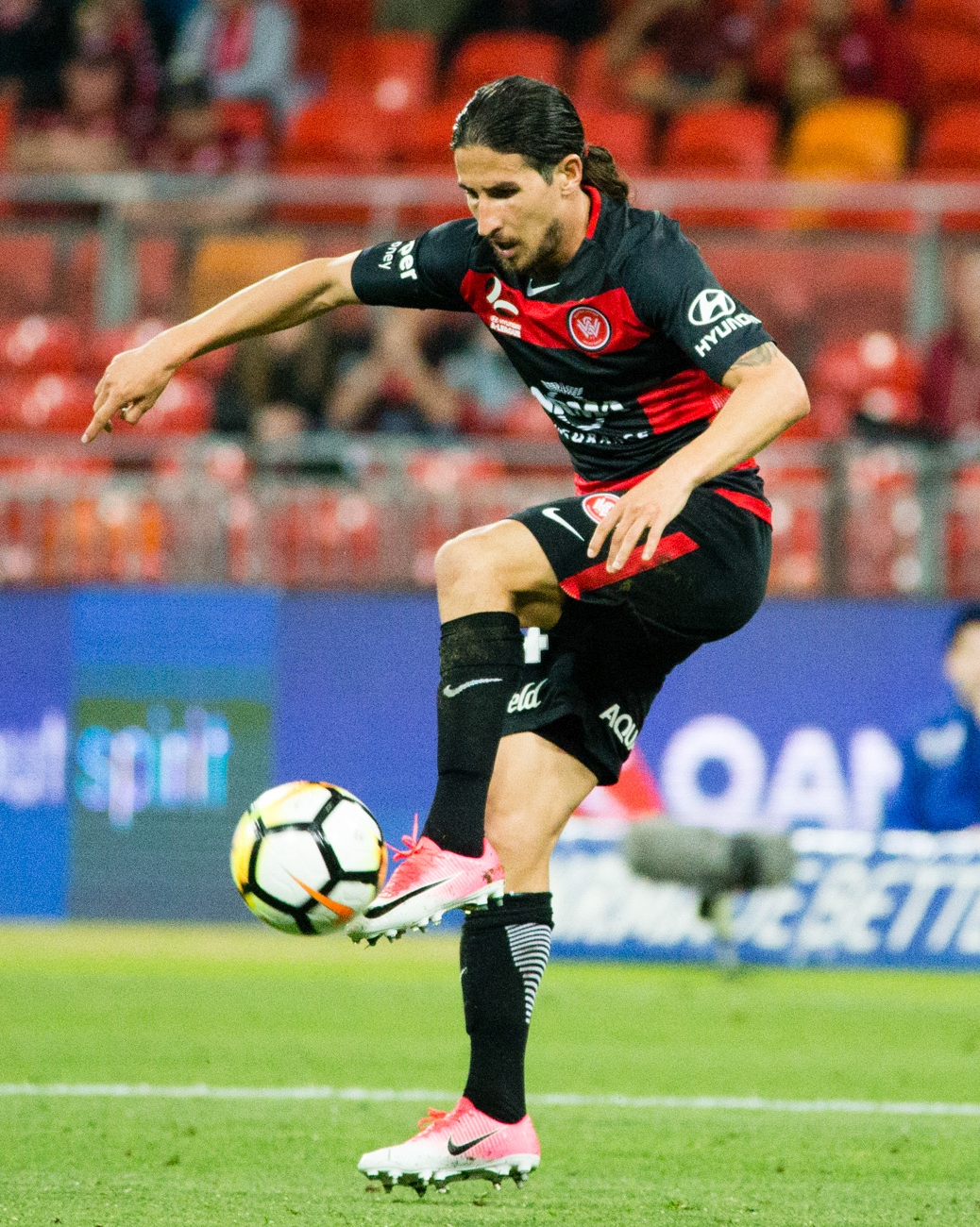
- Llorente with Western Sydney Wanderers in 2017

Personal information
- Full name: Raúl Llorente Raposo
- Date of birth: 2 April 1986 (age 40)
- Place of birth: Madrid, Spain
- Height: 1.70 m (5 ft 7 in)
- Position: Left-back

Youth career
- 2002–2005: Atlético Madrid

Senior career*
Years	Team	Apps	(Gls)
2005–2008	Atlético Madrid B	92	(1)
2008–2010	Alavés	60	(2)
2010–2011	Xerez	34	(0)
2012–2014	Tenerife	53	(2)
2014–2016	Kalloni	49	(1)
2016–2017	Platanias	16	(0)
2017–2019	Western Sydney Wanderers	42	(0)
2021	Villarrobledo	12	(0)
Total		358	(6)

International career
2002–2003	Spain U17	15	(0)
2005	Spain U19	2	(0)
Medal record
Representing Spain
Men's football
FIFA U-17 World Cup
Runner-up	2003 Finland
UEFA European Under-17 Championship
Runner-up	2003 Portugal
- * Club domestic league appearances and goals

Raúl Llorente Raposo (born 2 April 1986) is a Spanish former professional footballer who played as a left-back.

== Club career ==
Born in Madrid, Llorente graduated from the Atlético Madrid youth system, playing three seasons with the reserve side in the Segunda División B. In 2008–09 he first appeared in the Segunda División, starting and being relegated with Alavés.

After one more year with the Basques, Llorente returned to the second tier and signed a two-year contract with Xerez. In January 2012, however, he moved back to division three and joined Tenerife, helping the club to achieve promotion at the end of the 2012–13 campaign by contributing 29 games and two goals (play-offs included).

In another January transfer window, in 2014, Llorente moved abroad for the first time, going on to spend several seasons in the Super League Greece with Kalloni and Platanias. On 28 August 2017, the 31-year-old agreed to a one-year contract with Western Sydney Wanderers of the Australian A-League.

Llorente returned to football on 25 December 2020, joining third division club Villarrobledo.

== International career ==
Llorente represented Spain at the 2003 FIFA U-17 World Championship, making five appearances in the competition for the runners-up.

== Career statistics ==
As of match played on 22 December 2017

Club	Season	League			Cup		Other		Total	
Club	Season	Division	Apps	Goals	Apps	Goals	Apps	Goals	Apps	Goals
Atlético Madrid B	2005–06	Segunda División B	27	0	—		—		27	0
Atlético Madrid B	2006–07	Segunda División B	32	0	—		—		32	0
Atlético Madrid B	2007–08	Segunda División B	33	1	—		—		33	1
Atlético Madrid B	Total		92	1	—		—		92	1
Alavés	2008–09	Segunda División	30	0	1	0	—		31	0
Alavés	2009–10	Segunda División B	30	2	1	0	—		31	2
Alavés	Total		60	2	2	0	—		62	2
Xerez	2010–11	Segunda División	30	0	3	0	—		33	0
Xerez	2011–12	Segunda División	4	0	0	0	—		4	0
Xerez	Total		34	0	3	0	—		37	0
Tenerife	2011–12	Segunda División B	18	1	0	0	6 (Note: Appearances in Segunda División B play-offs)	0	24	1
Tenerife	2012–13	Segunda División B	27	1	0	0	2	1	29	2
Tenerife	2013–14	Segunda División	8	0	0	0	—		8	0
Tenerife	Total		53	2	0	0	8	1	61	3
Kalloni	2013–14	Super League Greece	9	0	0	0	—		9	0
Kalloni	2014–15	Super League Greece	26	1	1	0	—		27	1
Kalloni	2015–16	Super League Greece	14	0	0	0	—		14	0
Kalloni	Total		49	1	1	0	—		50	1
Platanias	2016–17	Super League Greece	16	0	7	1	—		23	1
Western Sydney Wanderers	2017–18	A-League	10	0	0	0	—		10	0
Career total			314	6	13	0	8	1	335	7
