= Jumpei Kusukami =

Japanese footballer

Jumpei Kusukami 楠神 順平
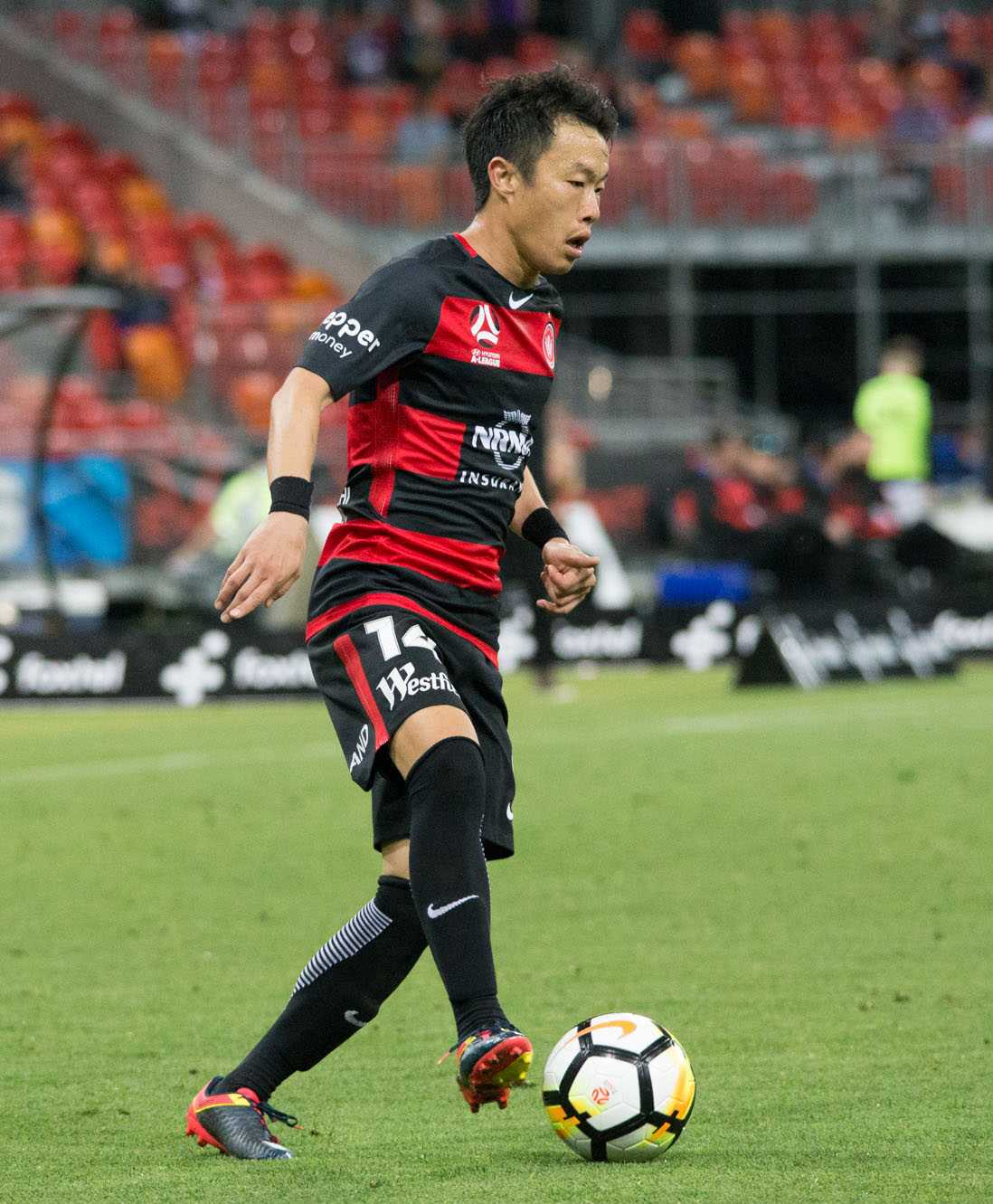
- Kusukami playing for WSW in 2017

Personal information
- Full name: Jumpei Kusukami
- Date of birth: 27 August 1987 (age 39)
- Place of birth: Aishō, Shiga, Japan
- Height: 1.71 m (5 ft 7 in)
- Position: Midfielder

Team information
- Current team: Nankatsu SC
- Number: 11

Youth career
- 2003–2005: Yasu High School

College career
Years	Team	Apps	(Gls)
2006–2009	Doshisha University		

Senior career*
Years	Team	Apps	(Gls)
2009–2012	Kawasaki Frontale	70	(9)
2013–2015	Cerezo Osaka	71	(4)
2016	Sagan Tosu	1	(0)
2016–2018	Western Sydney Wanderers	38	(4)
2018–2019	Shimizu S-Pulse	8	(0)
2018	→ Montedio Yamagata (loan)	11	(0)
2020–	Nankatsu SC	23	(1)
Medal record
Kawasaki Frontale
Runner-up	J1 League	2009
Runner-up	J.League Cup	2009
- * Club domestic league appearances and goals as of 14 October 2022

Jumpei Kusukami (楠神 順平, Kusukami Jumpei; born 27 August 1987) is a Japanese footballer currently playing for Nankatsu SC.

== Career ==
After playing for several Japanese clubs and having featured also an A-League team, Kusukami opted for a loan period from Shimizu S-Pulse to Montedio Yamagata in July 2018.

== Club statistics ==
As of 18 February 2019.

Club	Season	League			Cup		League Cup		Continental		Total	
Club	Season	Division	Apps	Goals	Apps	Goals	Apps	Goals	Apps	Goals	Apps	Goals
Kawasaki Frontale	2009	J1 League	1	0	0	0	0	0	–		1	0
Kawasaki Frontale	2010	J1 League	22	3	3	2	2	0	3	0	30	5
Kawasaki Frontale	2011	J1 League	19	1	3	1	4	0	–		26	2
Kawasaki Frontale	2012	J1 League	28	5	2	1	4	1	–		34	7
Kawasaki Frontale	Total		70	9	8	4	10	1	3	0	91	14
Cerezo Osaka	2013	J1 League	24	0	3	0	5	0	–		32	0
Cerezo Osaka	2014	J1 League	26	1	4	0	2	0	5	0	37	1
Cerezo Osaka	2015	J2 League	21	3	0	0	0	0	–		21	3
Cerezo Osaka	Total		71	4	7	0	7	0	5	0	90	4
Sagan Tosu	2016	J1 League	1	0	0	0	3	0	–		4	0
Western Sydney Wanderers	2016–17	A-League	27	3	2	0	–		6	2	35	5
Western Sydney Wanderers	2017–18	A-League	11	1	4	0	–		0	0	15	1
Western Sydney Wanderers	Total		38	4	6	0	0	0	6	2	50	6
Shimizu S-Pulse	2018	J1 League	2	0	1	0	4	0	–		7	0
Montedio Yamagata	2018	J2 League	5	0	–		–		–		5	0
Career total			187	17	22	6	22	1	14	2	250	24
