= Jack Clisby =

Australian soccer player

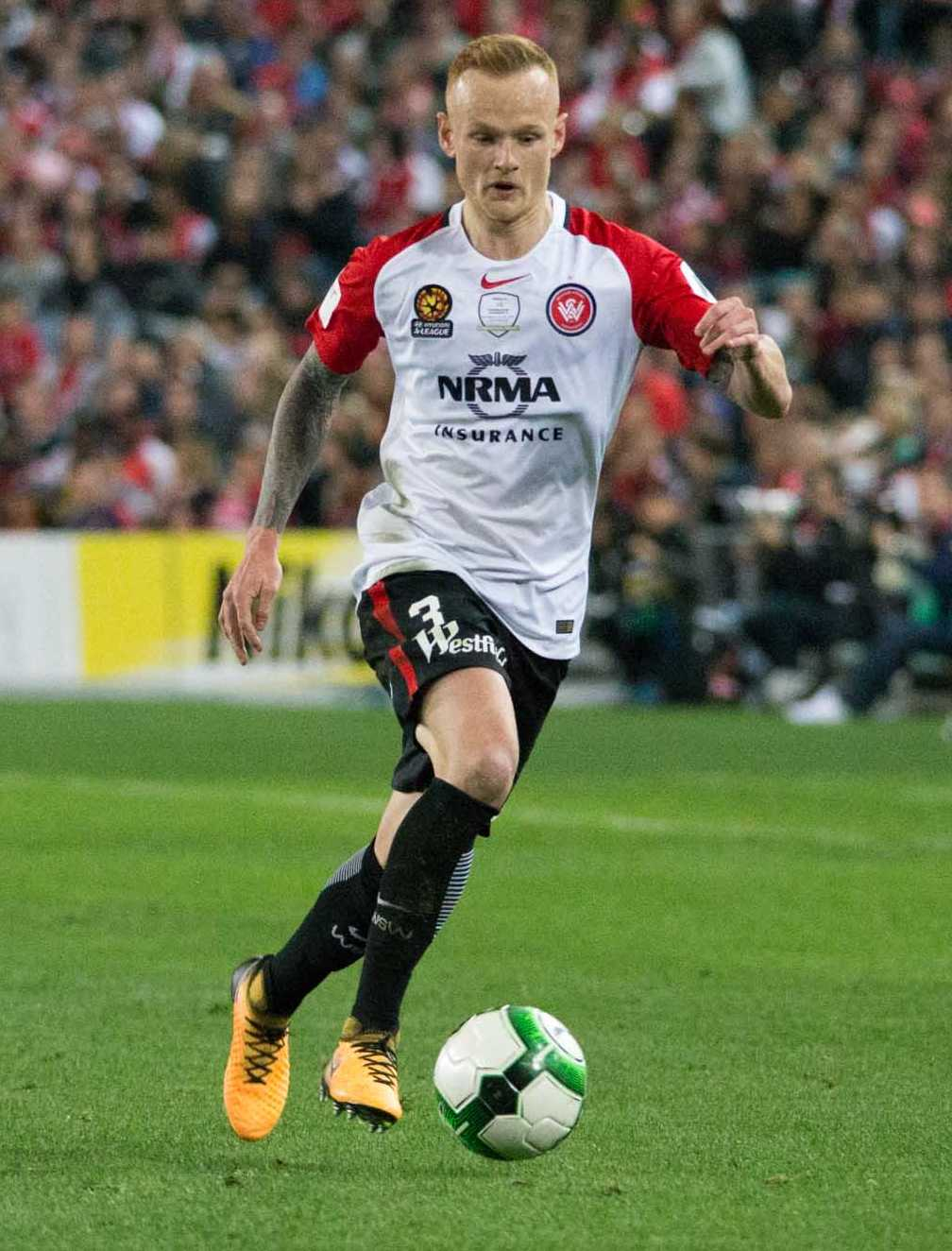
- Clisby playing for Western Sydney Wanderers in July 2017

Personal information
- Full name: Jack Clisby
- Date of birth: 16 February 1992 (age 34)
- Place of birth: Perth, Australia
- Height: 1.80 m (5 ft 11 in)
- Positions: Centre back; left back

Team information
- Current team: Olympic Kingsway

Youth career
- –2009: Sorrento FC
- 2009–2010: Perth Glory

Senior career*
Years	Team	Apps	(Gls)
2010	Balcatta SC	16	(1)
2010–2011	Perth SC	22	(0)
2012	Inglewood United	25	(3)
2013–2015	Perth Glory	29	(0)
2014	Perth Glory NPL	1	(0)
2015–2016	Melbourne City	31	(0)
2016–2018	Western Sydney Wanderers	37	(1)
2018–2021	Central Coast Mariners	71	(4)
2021–2023	Perth Glory	41	(3)
2023–2025	Western Sydney Wanderers	48	(1)
2026–	Olympic Kingsway	0	(0)
- * Club domestic league appearances and goals as of 9 July 2025

Jack Clisby is a former Australian soccer player who played as a left back.

== Club career ==
Clisby made his senior debut for Perth Glory on 26 January 2013, starting against Brisbane Roar. Clisby played 29 games for Perth Glory. He was then signed with Melbourne City in January 2015 for the 15/16 season.

Clisby then played for Western Sydney Wanderers followed by Central Coast Mariners. In June 2021, Clisby returned to Perth Glory.

After his time at Perth Glory he went back to the western Sydney Wanderers which was his last season professionally in the 2024/25 A-league season with one goal against the Central Coast Mariners

== Retirement ==
Jack Clisby now runs his own football development program in Perth called Jack Clisby Football since 2025 for footballers aged 5-15
