= Nicolás Martínez (footballer, born 1987) =

Argentine footballer

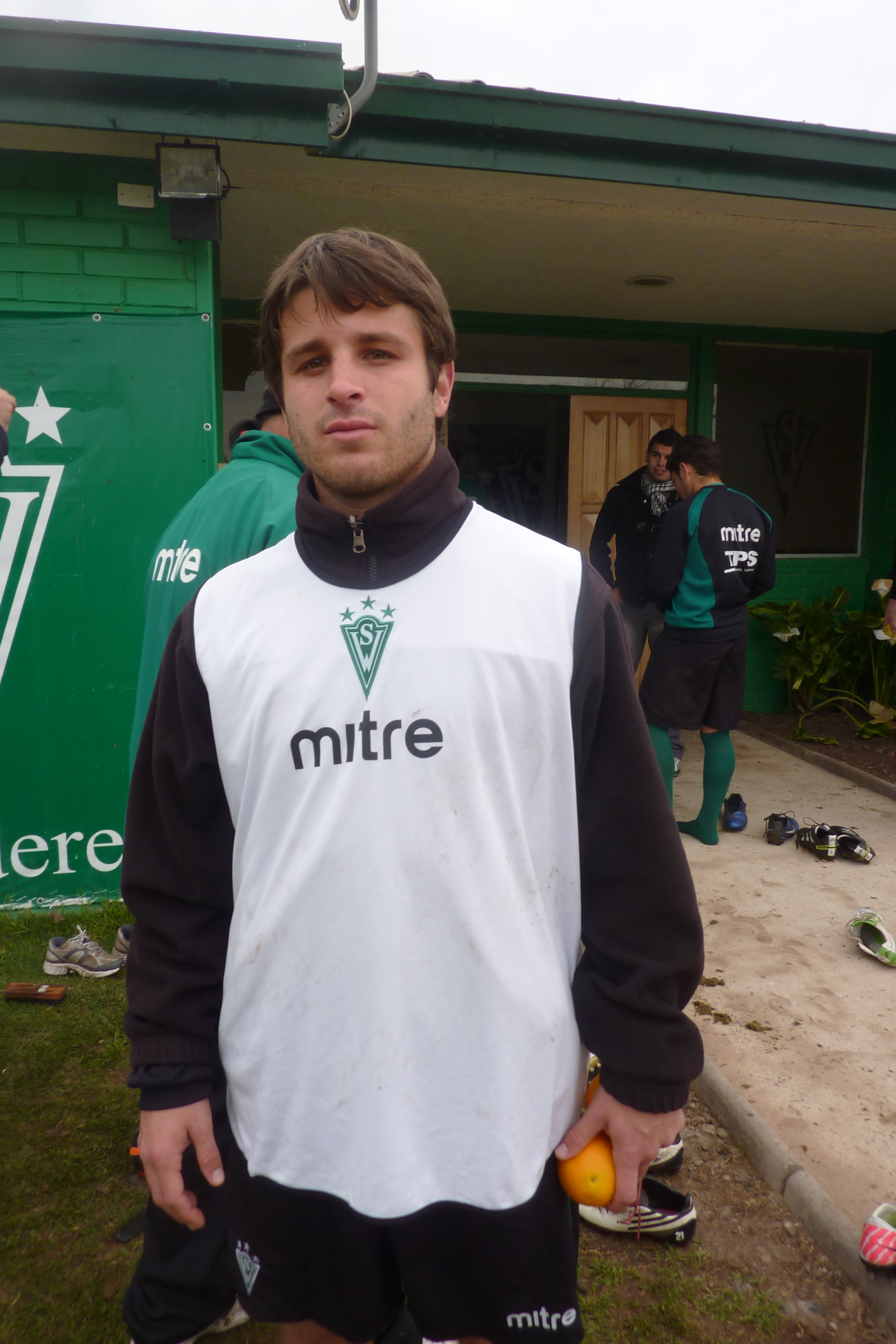
- Martínez with Santiago Wanderers in 2011

Personal information
- Date of birth: 25 September 1987 (age 39)
- Place of birth: Viedma, Argentina
- Height: 1.69 m (5 ft 7 in)
- Positions: Attacking midfielder; left winger

Youth career
- –2009: Vélez Sarfield

Senior career*
Years	Team	Apps	(Gls)
2008–2009	Vélez Sarfield	0	(0)
2008–2009	→ Almirante Brown (loan)	11	(0)
2009–2011	Independiente	11	(1)
2011–2012	Santiago Wanderers	33	(2)
2012–2013	Real Murcia	34	(1)
2013–2014	San Martín de San Juan	4	(0)
2014–2015	Panetolikos	42	(5)
2015–2018	Olympiacos	0	(0)
2015–2016	→ Anorthosis (loan)	33	(2)
2016–2017	→ Western Sydney Wanderers (loan)	27	(4)
2017–2018	→ Apollon Limassol (loan)	18	(4)
2018–2020	Aris	44	(4)
2020–2021	Volos	29	(0)
2021–2022	Apollon Smyrnis	26	(0)
- * Club domestic league appearances and goals as of 15 May 2022

Nicolás Martinez (born 25 September 1987), known simply as Nico, is an Argentine professional footballer who last played as a midfielder for Greek Super League 2 club Apollon Smyrnis.

His brother is the footballer Juan Manuel Martínez.

== Club career ==
Martinez was formed in the youth system of Vélez Sarfield, in 2008 he was loaned to Almirante Brown a team in third category of Argentina. In 2009, he joined Independiente but he did not make his first team debut until the year 2010. On 19 December 2010, Martínez scored in a 4–2 victory over Defensor Sporting in the Copa Sudamericana 2010, helping Independiente advance to the quarter-finals. In 2011, he left Independiente and signed with Santiago Wanderers of Chile.

In Santiago Wanderers is overshadowed by Tressor Moreno who held the same post in the field. The departure of the Colombian player gave him the chance to play a vital role for the club in Apertura 2012. When the year ends Santiago Wanderers did not take advantage of the purchase option and Martinez returned to Independiente.

On August 1, 2012, is signed to Real Murcia. It started well gaining his role in the starting XI. In his second day in the club at Estadio El Molinon against Sporting Gijon scored a wonderful goal putting his name in the scoreboard. This match was eventually won by Real Murcia, but gradually the club lost the title. Eventually during the season lost his place and remained on the bench. He concluded his contract with the club in July 2013. On August 8, 2013, he signed for a year contract with San Martín de San Juan.

=== Panetolikos ===
On 17 January 2014, he signed a contract with Panetolikos and played for a season in Super League Greece. In September 2014, Martinez expands his contract with the club till the summer of 2016.

The 27-year-old Argentine playmaker has been in excellent form since the start of the 2014–15 season and AEK Athens were interest in his signing. AEK considered making a bid after the end of the season and the possibility of completing this transfer is highly likely as the two clubs share an amicable relationship. Branco Milovanovic, AEK's technical director, is in contact with Martinez's agent and it is likely that an offer to land Panetolikos attacking midfielder is on the cards. On the other hand, the Argentinian midfielder is linked with the Greek champion Olympiacos. According to Goal newspaper Panetolikos have accepted a bid in the region of €600,000, as the manager of the club, Vitor Pereira was an admirer of Martinez.

=== Olympiacos ===
On 2 July 2015, Martinez signed a 4 years' contract with Greek champions Olympiacos for over €600,000.

==== Loan to Anorthosis ====
A month after he signed a year contract for Cypriot First Division club Anorthosis Famagusta on loan from Olympiacos. Negotiations between the two clubs had finalized with media reports suggesting that the player will spend the season on loan at the club and that Anorthosis Famagusta FC will foot €200,000 of his €350,000 per year salary. According to club sources, a player of Martinez's quality was what was missing last season when Anorthosis Famagusta just about missed out on Europe after finish fifth at the end of the 2014–15 season. He finished the year as the udisputable leader of the club, but they still finish fifth.

==== Loan to Western Sydney Wanderers ====
On 31 August 2016, in the last day of the summer transfer window, Western Sydney Wanderers have reportedly come to terms with 28-year-old Argentinian attacking midfielder and signed him on a long season loan from Super League club Olympiacos. As part of the loan deal with Western Sydney sources say that out of his current wages of $563,000 a season, the Wanderers have agreed to pay about $266,000 while Olympiacos will foot the remainder. Tony Popovic the coach of the club has placed his faith after signing on loan from Olympiacos. “When I came here the other players had been training for two months – I had quickly to get used to the players and the intensity. Here they work very hard, it’s not like in South America where sometimes if you are not fit you can still play football. Here it is very physical” Martinez said after his first training with the new club. On 6 November 2016, he scored the fastest goal in Wanderers Hyundai A-League history to put the visitors in front inside the first minute, in a 2–2 away draw against Perth Glory.

==== Loan to Apollon Limassol ====
On 31 August 2017, he signed a year contract for Cypriot First Division club Apollon Limassol on a long season loan from Olympiacos. On 18 September 2017, he scored his first goal with the club in a 4–2 home win game against Ermis Aradippou.

=== Aris ===
On 27 August 2018, newly promoted Aris has taken out-of-favour Argentinian midfielder Martinez as a free transfer from Olympiacos by signing a year contract for an undisclosed fee. Martinez is surplus to the requirements of the club, and travels to Thessaloniki to strength Aris’ deepening roster. His first goal came in a disappointing 4–1 away loss against Olympiacos, on 10 March 2019. On 31 March 2019, he came in as a substitute and scored in the dying minutes of the game, sealing a 3–1 home win against OFI. On 21 April 2019, he scored with a tap-in in a 2–1 away win against Panetolikos, but he didn't celebrate as a token of appreciation for his old club.

== Career statistics ==
As of 15 May 2022

Appearances and goals by club, season and competition
Club	Season	League			Cup		Continental		Other		Total	
Club	Season	Division	Apps	Goals	Apps	Goals	Apps	Goals	Apps	Goals	Apps	Goals
Independiente	2010–11	Argentine Primera División	11	1	—		—		—		11	1
Santiago Wanderers	2011	Chilean Primera División	16	2	0	0	0	0	2	0	18	2
Santiago Wanderers	2012	Chilean Primera División	17	0	0	0	—		—		17	0
Santiago Wanderers	Total		33	2	0	0	0	0	2	0	35	2
Real Murcia	2012–13	Segunda División	34	1	1	0	—		—		35	1
San Martín de San Juan	2013–14	Primera B Nacional	4	0	0	0	—		—		4	0
Panetolikos	2013–14	Super League Greece	10	2	—		—		—		10	2
Panetolikos	2014–15	Super League Greece	32	3	1	0	—		—		33	3
Panetolikos	Total		42	5	1	0	—		—		43	5
Anorthosis (loan)	2015–16	Cypriot First Division	33	2	4	0	—		—		37	2
Western Sydney Wanderers (loan)	2016–17	A-League	27	4	0	0	6	0	—		33	4
Apollon Limassol (loan)	2017–18	Cypriot First Division	18	4	2	0	3	0	—		23	4
Aris	2018–19	Super League Greece	21	3	2	0	—		—		23	3
Aris	2019–20	Super League Greece	23	1	3	0	3	0	—		29	1
Aris	Total		44	4	5	0	3	0	—		52	4
Volos	2020–21	Super League Greece	29	0	4	1	—		—		33	1
Apollon Smyrnis	2021–22	Super League Greece	26	0	0	0	—		—		26	0
Career total			301	23	17	1	12	0	2	0	332	24

== Honours ==
Individual

- Super League Greece Team of the Season: 2014–15
