= Brendon Santalab =

Australian soccer player (born 1982)

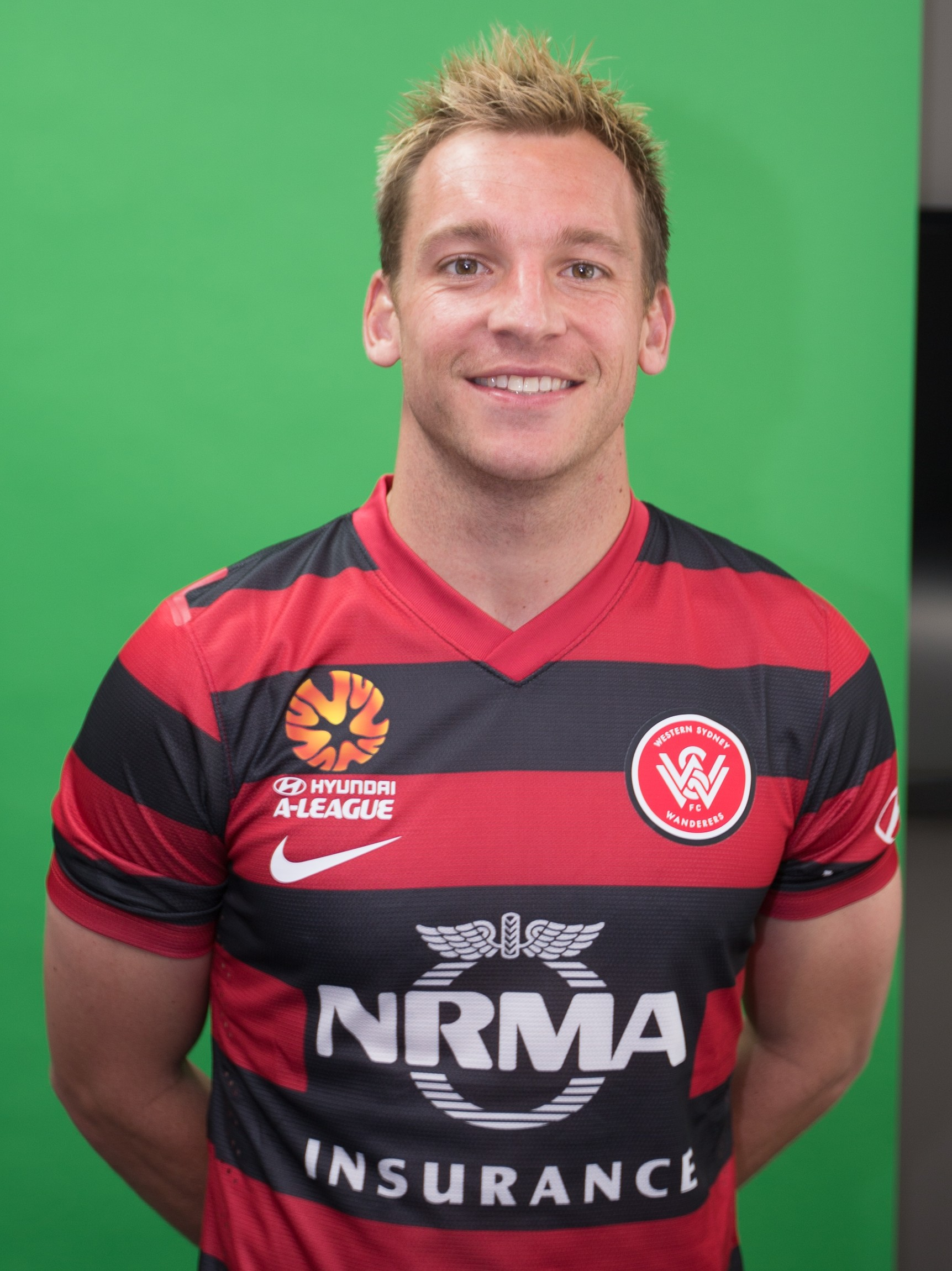
- Santalab with Western Sydney Wanderers in 2013

Personal information
- Full name: Brendon James Santalab
- Date of birth: 9 September 1982 (age 44)
- Place of birth: Wollongong, New South Wales, Australia
- Height: 1.73 m (5 ft 8 in)
- Positions: Left winger; forward

Youth career
- Unanderra Hearts
- South Coast United

Senior career*
Years	Team	Apps	(Gls)
2000–2001	Parramatta Power	8	(1)
2001–2003	Sydney United	28	(7)
2003	Geylang United	22	(23)
2003–2004	Sydney United	14	(5)
2004–2005	Oostende	22	(3)
2005–2006	Sint-Truiden	9	(0)
2006–2007	→ Újpest FC (loan)	0	(0)
2007–2009	Sydney FC	23	(4)
2009	North Queensland Fury	0	(0)
2009–2011	Chengdu Blades	40	(18)
2012–2013	Chongqing Lifan	35	(15)
2013–2018	Western Sydney Wanderers	97	(35)
2018–2019	Perth Glory	18	(2)
2019	Dandenong City	13	(8)
2020	Caroline Springs George Cross	0	(0)
2021–	FC Strathmore	19	(6)
- * Club domestic league appearances and goals as of 5 December 2022

Brendon James Santalab (Croatian: Šantalab; born 9 September 1982) is a former Australian professional soccer player who played as a striker he last played for Victorian State League Division 1 side FC Strathmore.

== Club career ==
Santalab originally started out as an apprentice at Parramatta Power before moving to Sydney United under the tutelage of Branko Culina. At the end of the 2003–04 National Soccer League season, he moved to K.V. Oostende in the Belgian First Division. After a brief stint, he moved to another Belgian First Division club, Sint-Truidense V.V. before moving to Hungary for a six-month period with Újpest FC. On 23 June 2007, Santalab was signed by A-League club Sydney FC on a two-year contract, thus reuniting him with Branko Culina.

=== 2000s ===
Santalab made 23 appearances for Sydney FC between 2007 and 2009, scoring four goals. During a game against Adelaide United, Santalab scored a goal from outside the box, that curled into the top corner – a goal that was later ruled the 2007–08 season A-League goal of the year. He scored another goal against Adelaide in the 2008–09 season at the Sydney Football Stadium, when he took a shot from 35 metres out, that slammed into the top corner. Sydney won the match 3–0. His fourth goal came during Sydney's 2–1 upset loss against Perth Glory.

On 14 November 2008, it was announced that Santalab had signed a two-year contract with then-new A-League side the North Queensland Fury for the 2009–10 season. It was announced by North Queensland, that Chinese Super League club Chengdu Blades may make an offer to him, before the start of the season. North Queensland accepted an offer from Chengdu on 21 July. He scored 9 goals during his 12 appearances with the Chengdu Blades.

=== 2010s ===
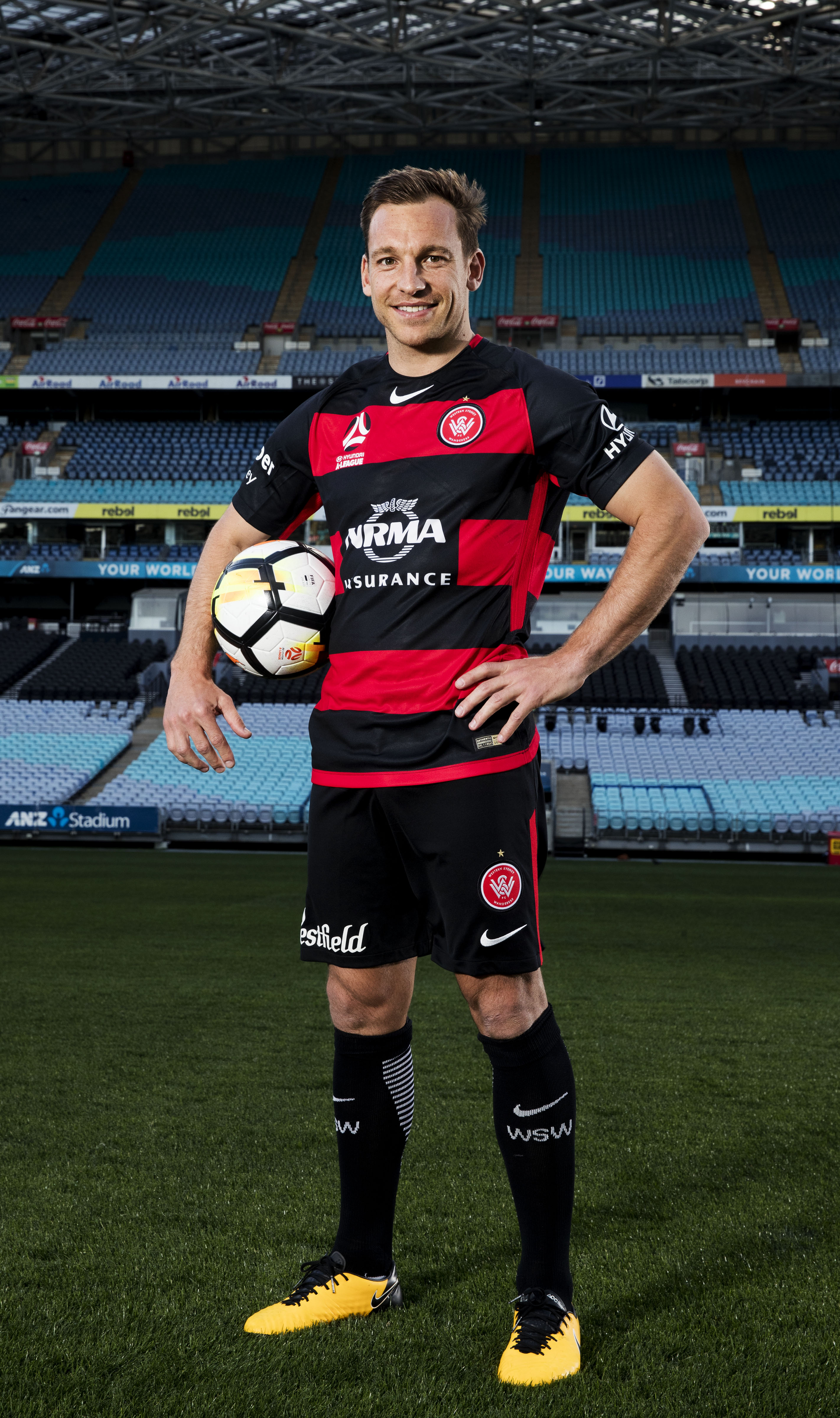
Brendon Santalab #11 Western Sydney Wanderers.

In 2012, Santalab signed with Chongqing Lifan for one season before signing with the A-League Western Sydney Wanderers.

Santalab scored his first goal for Western Sydney Wanderers in the 7th round of the 2013–14 A-League season, losing to Brisbane Roar 3–1 at Suncorp Stadium.

On 14 May 2014, in the Asian Champions League game against Sanfrecce Hiroshima with 5 minutes to go, Santalab scored the equalising goal that sent Western Sydney Wanderers into the quarter finals of the AFC Champions League.

In the 16th round of the 2014–15 A-League season during a home game at Penrith Stadium against Wellington Phoenix, Santalab scored the second goal in a 2–0 win for his first of the season.

During Santalab's five seasons with the Western Sydney Wanderers he was awarded the Western Sydney Wanderers Player of the Year in the 2016/17 and received two of the Club's Golden Boot Awards in 2015/16 and 2016/17. He is also the Western Sydney Wanderers highest goal scorer of all time.

In June 2018, Santalab signed a one-year deal with Perth Glory, reuniting with former coach and mentor, Tony Popovic. Santalab won the minor premiership with the Glory, but missed a penalty in the shoot-out in the 2019 A-League Grand Final and subsequently lost the final.

In May 2019, Santalab signed for semi-professional side Dandenong City who compete in the National Premier Leagues Victoria. When he joined City, they were in 13th place. Santalab ended the season with 8 goals in 13 games, propelling the club to 7th place.

=== 2020s ===
In September 2019, Caroline Springs George Cross FC announced that Santalab would be joining the club for the 2020 season, also appointing him as the "Commercial & Football Sales Manager".

== Honours ==
=== Western Sydney Wanderers ===
- AFC Champions League: 2014

=== Perth Glory ===
- A-League Premiership: 2018–19

=== Individual ===
- Western Sydney Wanderers Golden Boot Winner: 2015–16
- Western Sydney Wanderers Player of the Year: 2016–17
- Western Sydney Wanderers Golden Boot Winner: 2016–17
