= Lachlan Scott =

Australian soccer player

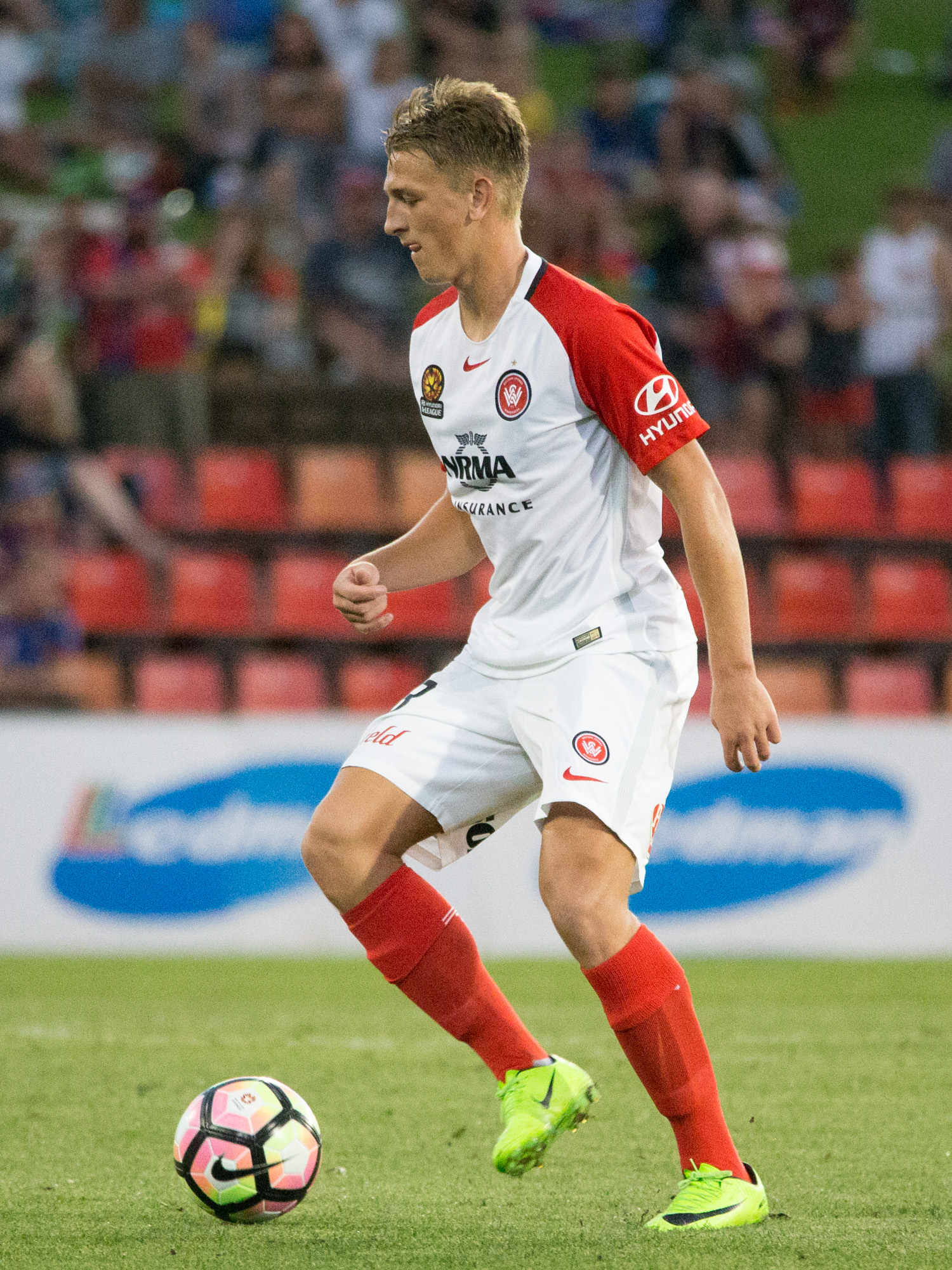
- Scott with Western Sydney Wanderers in 2017

Personal information
- Full name: Lachlan John Scott
- Date of birth: 15 April 1997 (age 29)
- Place of birth: Wollongong, New South Wales, Australia
- Height: 1.80 m (5 ft 11 in)
- Position: Striker

Team information
- Current team: Wollongong Wolves
- Number: 24

Youth career
- –2007: Balgownie Rangers
- 2007–2012: Wollongong Wolves
- 2012–2016: APIA Leichhardt
- 2015: Sydney FC
- 2016: Western Sydney Wanderers

Senior career*
Years	Team	Apps	(Gls)
2015	APIA Leichhardt	7	(0)
2016–2018	Western Sydney Wanderers NPL	22	(22)
2016–2019	Western Sydney Wanderers	20	(1)
2019–	Wollongong Wolves	115	(59)

International career^{‡}
2016	Australia U-20	7	(3)
2017	Australia U-23	1	(0)
Medal record
Men's football
Representing Australia
AFF U-19 Youth Championship
First place	2016 Vietnam	U-20 Team
- * Club domestic league appearances and goals as of 23 January 2025 ‡ National team caps and goals as of 19 July 2017

Lachlan John Scott (born 15 April 1997) is an Australian professional soccer player who plays as a forward for Wollongong Wolves.

== Club career ==
=== Western Sydney Wanderers ===
In May 2016, Scott was promoted by Western Sydney Wanderers to the senior squad. He made his professional debut for the Wanderers in the 2016 FFA Cup against A-League side Wellignton Phoenix, scoring the first two goals of the Wanderers' comeback from trailing 0–2 to a 3–2 victory.

=== Wollongong Wolves ===
In February 2019, Scott was released by mutual consent by Western Sydney Wanderers and a few days later signed for Wollongong Wolves.

== Career statistics ==
=== Club ===
As of 2 August 2016

Club	Season	League		Cup		Continental		Other		Total	
Club	Season	Apps	Goals	Apps	Goals	Apps	Goals	Apps	Goals	Apps	Goals
Western Sydney Wanderers	2016–17	16	1	1	2	0	0	0	0	17	3
Western Sydney Wanderers	Total	16	1	1	2	0	0	0	0	17	3
Career total		16	1	1	2	0	0	0	0	17	3

== Honours ==
=== Club ===
Western Sydney Wanderers FC|Western Sydney Wanderers

- Y-League Championship: 2017–18

=== International ===
Australia U20

- AFF U-19 Youth Championship: 2016
