= List of Western Sydney Wanderers FC players (1–24 appearances) =

== Key ==
- The list is ordered first by date of debut, and then if necessary in alphabetical order.
- Appearances as a substitute are included.
- Statistics are correct up to and including the match played on 12 August 2020. Where a player left the club permanently after this date, his statistics are updated to his date of leaving.

Positions key
GK	Goalkeeper
DF	Defender
MF	Midfielder
FW	Forward

Nationality
Unless otherwise noted, the nationality of a player is determined by the country/countries which he has played for, or if said person has not played international football, their country of birth.
Position
Playing positions are listed according to the tactical formations that were employed at the time.
Club career
Club career is defined as the first and last calendar years in which the player appeared for the club in any of the competitions listed below.
Total appearances and Total goals
Total appearances and goals comprise those in the A-League, A-League Finals, FFA Cup, AFC Champions League and FIFA Club World Cup

== Players ==
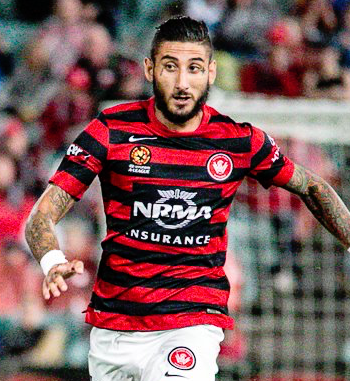
Kerem Bulut scored two goals in his Wanderers debut against Sydney FC.

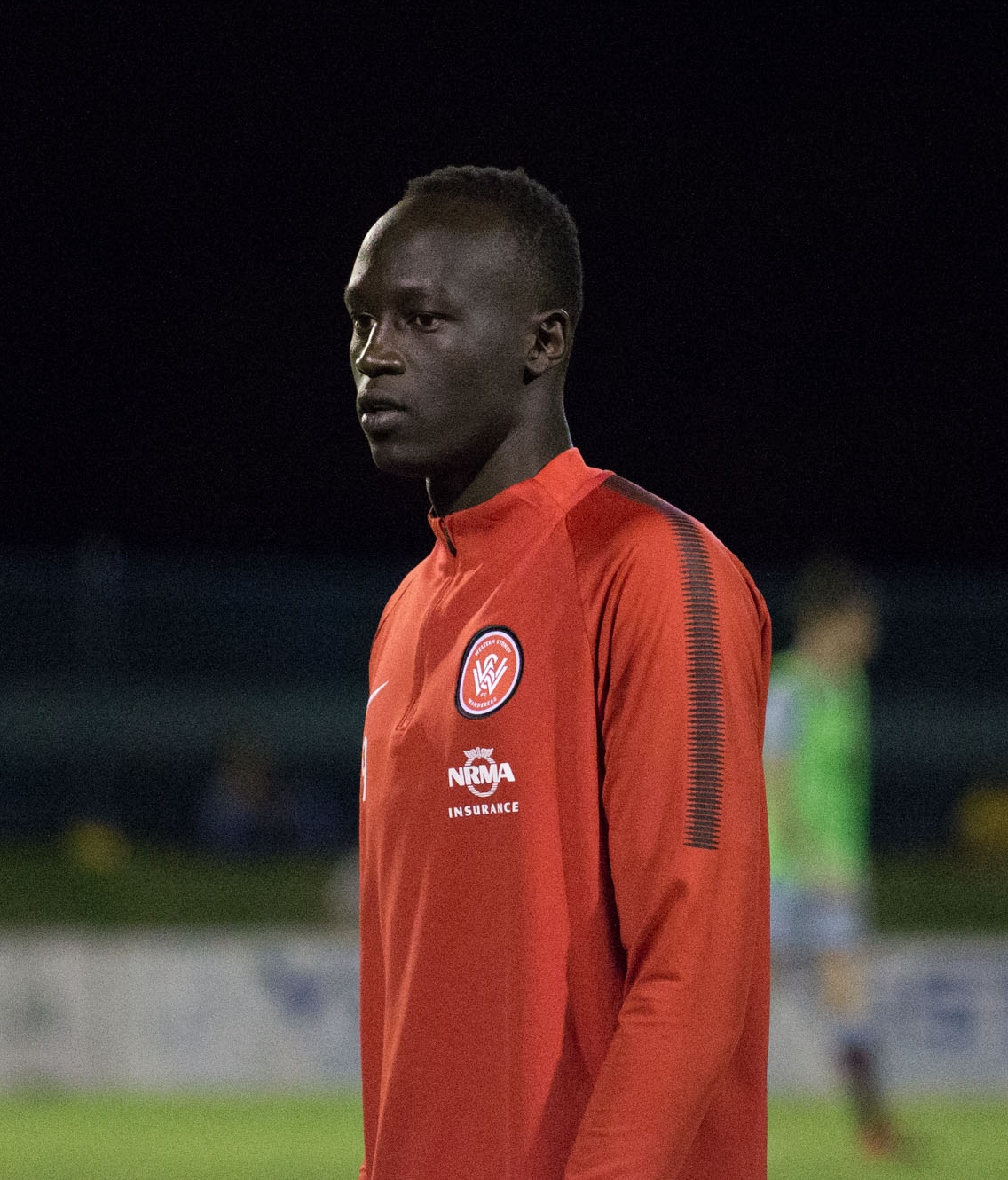
Abraham Majok appeared 23 times with him playing 16 matches as a substitute.

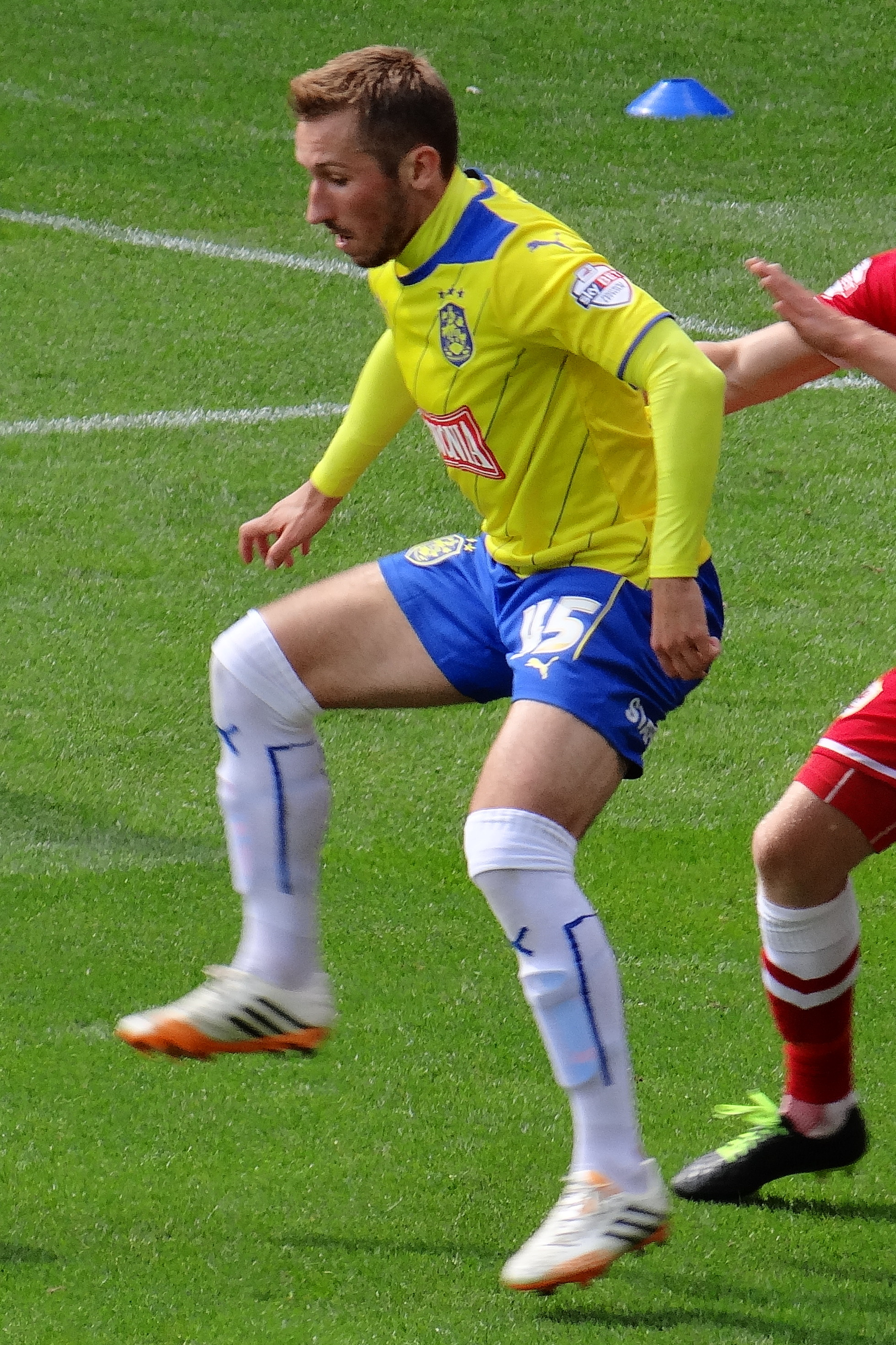
Radosław Majewski played three times in the FFA Cup, but never played a first-team match in the A-League.

List of Western Sydney Wanderers FC players with between 1 and 24 appearances
Player	Nationality	Pos	Club career	Starts	Subs	Total	Goals
Player	Nationality	Pos	Club career	Appearances			Goals
Joey Gibbs	Australia	FW	2012–2013	8	5	13	2
Tahj Minniecon	Australia	FW	2012–2014	5	11	16	0
Reece Caiara	Australia	DF	2012–2014	0	2	2	0
Rocky Visconte	Australia	FW	2013	0	3	3	1
Yianni Perkatis	Australia	MF	2012–2015	8	1	9	0
Dean Heffernan	Australia	DF	2013–2014	10	4	14	0
Alusine Fofanah	Australia	MF	2013–2016	8	1	9	0
Jerrad Tyson	Australia	GK	2012–2014; 2016–2018	10	0	10	0
Golgol Mebrahtu	Australia	–	2014–2016	2	8	10	1
Daniel Mullen	Australia	–	2014–2015	16	0	16	0
Daniel Alessi	Australia	–	2014–2016	8	3	11	0
Vitor Saba	Australia	–	2014–2015	5	10	15	1
Seyi Adeleke	Australia	–	2014–2015	6	0	6	0
Dean Bouzanis	Australia	–	2014–2016	8	0	8	0
Nick Kalmar	Australia	–	2014–2015	10	3	13	2
Michael Trajkovski	Australia	–	2015	0	1	1	0
Steve Kuzmanovski	Australia	–	2014–2015	3	5	8	0
Sam Gallaway	Australia	–	2015	10	4	14	0
Yojiro Takahagi	Japan	–	2015	15	2	17	3
Yusuke Tanaka	Japan	–	2015	15	0	15	0
Kerem Bulut	Australia	–	2015; 2016	16	4	20	6
Nick Ward	Australia	–	2015	0	1	1	0
Shayne D'Cunha	Australia	–	2015–2016	1	1	2	0
Liam Youlley	Australia	–	2015–2017	1	3	4	1
Josh Macdonald	Australia	–	2015	0	5	5	0
Jacob Pepper	Australia	–	2015–2016	8	6	14	0
Federico Piovaccari	Italy	–	2015–2016	12	2	14	2
Mario Shabow	Australia	–	2015–2017	0	3	3	0
Liam Reddy	Australia	–	2015–2016	6	0	6	0
Matt Sim	Australia	–	2016	0	1	1	0
Bruno Piñatares	Uruguay	–	2016–2017	13	8	21	0
Aritz Borda	Spain	DF	2016–2017	20	0	20	1
Jacob Melling	Australia	MF	2016–2018	3	3	6	0
Terry Antonis	Australia	–	2017	13	1	14	3
Ryan Griffiths	Australia	FW	2017	2	5	7	0
Abraham Majok	Australia	FW	2016–2019	7	16	23	2
Stefan Zinni	Australia	–	2017	0	2	2	0
Chris Herd	Australia	DF	2017–2018	10	2	12	0
Michael Thwaite	Australia	DF	2017–2018	24	0	24	1
Álvaro Cejudo	Spain	MF	2017–2018	17	4	21	2
Marcelo Carrusca	Argentina	FW	2018	10	2	12	1
Chris Ikonomidis	Australia	FW	2017–2018	9	1	10	3
Marc Tokich	Australia	MF	2017–2019	4	7	11	0
Kosta Grozos	Australia	FW	2016–	4	6	10	0
Nick Fitzgerald	Australia	FW	2018–2019	4	11	15	0
Danijel Nizic	Australia	GK	2018–2019	4	1	5	0
Alexander Baumjohann	Germany	MF	2018–2019	20	3	23	4
Mathieu Cordier	Australia	FW	2018–2020	4	2	6	0
Rashid Mahazi	Australia	MF	2018–2019	10	6	16	1
Ruon Tongyik	Australia	DF	2018–2019	2	0	2	0
Nicholas Suman	Australia	GK	2016–2020	5	0	5	0
Giancarlo Gallifuoco	Australia	DF	2019	4	3	7	0
Daniel Wilmering	Australia	DF	2019–	7	5	12	0
Jack Greenwood	Australia	GK	2018–	2	0	2	0
Mohamed Adam	Australia	FW	2019–	22	0	22	2
Radosław Majewski	Poland	MF	2019–2020	3	0	3	1
Daniel Lopar	Switzerland	GK	2019–	23	0	23	0
Nick Sullivan	Australia	MF	2019–2020	7	9	16	0
Fabian Monge	Australia	FW	2019–	0	1	1	0
Matthew Jurman	Australia	DF	2019–2020	24	0	24	0
Alexander Meier	Germany	FW	2019–2020	8	4	12	1
Nicolai Müller	Germany	FW	2019–	18	1	19	5
Jake Trew	Australia	FW	2019–	0	1	1	0
Ali Auglah	Australia	FW	2020–	0	1	1	0
Simon Cox	Ireland	FW	2020–	10	2	12	3
Jarrod Carluccio	Australia	DF	2020–	1	0	1	0
Noah Pagden	Australia	DF	2020–	0	1	1	0
Tristan Prendergast	Australia	GK	2020–	5	0	5	0
