= 2020–21 Western Sydney Wanderers FC season =

Western Sydney Wanderers
2020–21 season
- Chairman: Paul Lederer
- Manager: Jean-Paul de Marigny (to 12 October 2020); Carl Robinson (from 15 October 2020)
- Stadium: Bankwest Stadium, Parramatta
- A-League: 8th
- Top goalscorer: League: Bruce Kamau (9 goals); All: Bruce Kamau (9 goals)
- Highest home attendance: 20,336 vs Sydney FC (1 May 2021)
- Lowest home attendance: 4,976 vs Melbourne City (2 March 2021)
- Average home league attendance: 8,062
Home colours	Away colours

The 2020–21 Western Sydney Wanderers season was the club's ninth season since its establishment in 2012. The club participated in the A-League for the ninth time.

== Pre-season ==
The Western Sydney Wanderers started the season with Jean-Paul de Marigny as their head coach after he was appointed in July permanently, following an interim session after the sacking of Markus Babbel. Three months after his appointment, Wanderers announced de Marigny's sacking with no explanation. On 15 October 2020, the Wanderers announced the signing of Carl Robinson from Newcastle Jets as de Marigny's replacement.

== Players ==
=== First team squad ===
Note: Flags indicate national team as defined under FIFA eligibility rules; some limited exceptions apply. Players may hold more than one non-FIFA nationality.

No.	Pos.	Nation	Player
2	DF	SCO	Ziggy Gordon
4	DF	AUS	Dylan McGowan (captain)
6	DF	AUS	Tass Mourdoukoutas
7	FW	AUS	Bruce Kamau
8	MF	AUS	Steven Ugarkovic
9	FW	AUS	Bernie Ibini
11	FW	AUS	Kwame Yeboah
12	FW	AUS	Mitchell Duke (on loan from Al Taawoun)
13	DF	AUS	Tate Russell
14	MF	AUS	James Troisi
17	MF	AUS	Keanu Baccus
18	MF	SCO	Graham Dorrans
19	MF	ENG	Jordon Mutch
20	GK	AUS	Vedran Janjetovic

No.	Pos.	Nation	Player
23	MF	AUS	Kosta Grozos
25	DF	AUS	Phillip Cancar
26	MF	AUS	Jarrod Carluccio (scholarship)
27	FW	GER	Nicolai Müller
29	DF	AUS	Daniel Wilmering (scholarship)
30	GK	AUS	Daniel Margush
33	DF	AUS	Mark Natta (scholarship)
34	DF	GER	Patrick Ziegler
36	MF	AUS	Alessandro Lopane (scholarship)
39	DF	AUS	Thomas Aquilina (scholarship)
40	GK	AUS	Noah James (on loan from Newcastle Jets)
50	GK	AUS	Oliver Kalac (scholarship)
77	FW	AUS	Scott McDonald
—	DF	AUS	Mohamed Al-Taay (scholarship)

== Transfers ==
=== From youth squad ===
N	Pos.	Nat.	Name	Age	Notes
33	DF	(Australia)	Mark Natta	17	2 year scholarship contract
36	MF	(Australia)	Alessandro Lopane	16	2 year scholarship contract
32	DF	(Australia)	Jarrod Carluccio	19	1 year scholarship contract
39	DF	(Australia)	Thomas Aquilina	19	2 year scholarship contract
	MF	(Australia)	Mohamed Al-Taay	20	1 year scholarship contract
37	FW	(Australia)	Stefan Nikolic	17	2 year scholarship contract

=== Transfers in ===
No.	Position	Name	Transferred from	Type/fee	Contract length	Date	Ref
24	MF	Anthony Lesiotis	Unattached	Free transfer	2 years	5 November 2020	
18	MF	(Scotland) Graham Dorrans	(Scotland) Dundee	Free transfer	2 years	9 November 2020	
30	GK	Daniel Margush	Unattached	Free transfer	2 years	11 November 2020	
25	DF	Phillip Cancar	(Croatia) Hrvatski Dragovoljac	Free transfer	1 year	15 November 2020	
14	MF	James Troisi	Adelaide United	Free transfer	2 years	15 December 2020	
2	DF	(Scotland) Ziggy Gordon	Central Coast Mariners	Free transfer	2 years	17 December 2020	
9	FW	Bernie Ibini	Newcastle Jets	Free transfer	2 years	17 December 2020	
40	GK	Noah James	Newcastle Jets	Loan	1 year	30 December 2020	
19	MF	(England) Jordon Mutch	Unattached	Free transfer	6 months	5 January 2021	
12	FW	Mitchell Duke	(Saudi Arabia) Al-Taawoun	Loan	6 months	1 February 2021	
77	FW	Scott McDonald	Unattached	Free transfer	2 months	28 April 2021	
8	MF	Steven Ugarkovic	Newcastle Jets	Free transfer	1.5 years	7 May 2021	

=== Transfers out ===
No.	Position	Player	Transferred to	Type/fee	Date	Ref
19	MF	(Switzerland) Pirmin Schwegler	Retired		13 July 2020	
–	MF	(Poland) Radosław Majewski	Unattached	End of contract	3 August 2020	
7	FW	Mitchell Duke	(Saudi Arabia) Al-Taawoun	Free transfer	20 August 2020	
40	GK	Nicholas Suman	Macarthur FC	Free transfer	7 September 2020	
6	DF	Matthew Jurman	(Greece) Xanthi	End of contract	25 September 2020	
16	DF	Mathieu Cordier	Unattached	End of contract	16 October 2020	
22	MF	Nick Sullivan	Unattached	End of contract	16 October 2020	
50	GK	Tristan Prendergast	Unattached	End of contract	16 October 2020	
1	GK	(Switzerland) Daniel Lopar	Unattached	Mutual contract termination	11 December 2020	
28	MF	Fabian Monge	Unattached	Mutual contract termination	29 December 2020	
31	DF	Noah Pagden	Unattached	Mutual contract termination	29 December 2020	
35	FW	(Sudan) Mohamed Adam	Unattached	Mutual contract termination	29 December 2020	
37	FW	Stefan Nikolic	(Australia) Marconi Stallions	Mutual contract termination	22 February 2021	
24	MF	Anthony Lesiotis	Unattached	Mutual contract termination	7 April 2021	
5	DF	(North Macedonia) Daniel Georgievski	Melbourne City	Mutual contract termination	29 April 2021	
8	MF	Jordan O'Doherty	Newcastle Jets	Mutual contract termination	6 May 2021	
10	FW	(Republic of Ireland) Simon Cox	Unattached	Mutual contract termination	12 May 2021	

=== Contract extensions ===
No.	Name	Position	Duration	Date	Notes
23	Kosta Grozos	Midfielder	1 year	16 October 2020	promoted to senior contract
27	(Germany) Nicolai Müller	Winger	1 year	16 October 2020	
7	Bruce Kamau	Winger	1 year	23 November 2020	
29	Daniel Wilmering	Defender	2 years	25 March 2021	promoted to senior contract
13	Tate Russell	Right-back	2 years	21 April 2021	

== Pre-season and friendlies ==
14 November 2020	Western Sydney Wanderers (Australia)	2–0	(Australia) Blacktown Spartans	Australia
	Georgievski (?); Carluccio (?)	Report		Attendance: 0 (behind closed doors)

21 November 2020	Western Sydney Wanderers (Australia)	12–2	(Australia) Macarthur Rams	Australia
13:00 AEDT	O'Doherty 5', 41'; Auglah 32', 39', 55'; Pelekanos 64', 66'; Grozos 71'; Carluccio 74'; Lopane 76'; Aquilina 82'; Badolato 86'	Report	? 13'; ? 27'	Attendance: 0 (behind closed doors)

27 November 2020	Western Sydney Wanderers (Australia)	2–3 (a.e.t.)	(Australia) Central Coast Mariners	Blacktown, Australia
	Müller 58'; Triantis 73'	Report	Bonada 38'; Stensness 54'; McCarthy 110'	Stadium: Wanderers Centre of Excellence; Attendance: 0 (behind closed doors)

7 December 2020	Western Sydney Wanderers (Australia)	0–2	(Australia) Adelaide United	Sydney, Australia
17:30 AEDT		Report	Yengi 15'; Konstandopoulos 90'	Stadium: Valentine Sports Park; Attendance: 0 (behind closed doors)

12 December 2020	Western Sydney Wanderers (Australia)	1–3	(New Zealand) Wellington Phoenix	Sydney, Australia
	Pelekanos 80'	Report	DeVere 6'; Sotirio 24'; Ball 54'	Attendance: 0 (behind closed doors)

19 December 2020	Western Sydney Wanderers (Australia)	4–0	(Australia) Blacktown City	Australia
	Ibini 7'; Cox 14'; Russell 50'; Grozos 58'	Report		Attendance: 0 (behind closed doors)

== Competitions ==
Win Draw Loss

=== Overview ===
Competition	First match	Last match	Starting round	Final position	Record							
Competition	First match	Last match	Starting round	Final position	Pld	W	D	L	GF	GA	GD	Win %
A-League	30 December 2020	3 June 2021	Matchday 1	8th	26	9	8	9	45	43	+2	34.62
Total					26	9	8	9	45	43	+2	34.62

Source: Soccerway

=== A-League ===
==== League table ====
Pos	Team	Pld	W	D	L	GF	GA	GD	Pts	Qualification
6	Macarthur FC	26	11	6	9	33	36	−3	39	Qualification for finals series (Note: The top two teams entered the finals series at the semi-finals, while the teams ranked third to sixth entered the finals series at the elimination-finals.)
7	Wellington Phoenix (Note: Wellington Phoenix cannot qualify for Asian Football Confederation competitions as they are based in New Zealand, which is under the Oceania Football Confederation.)	26	10	8	8	44	34	+10	38	
8	Western Sydney Wanderers	26	9	8	9	45	43	+2	35	
9	Perth Glory	26	9	7	10	44	44	0	34	Qualification for 2021 FFA Cup play-offs (Note: The top 8 teams qualified for the round of 32, while the bottom four teams participated in a playoff round.)
10	Western United	26	8	4	14	30	47	−17	28	Qualification for 2021 FFA Cup play-offs

Source: A-Leagues
Rules for classification: 1) Points; 2) Goal difference; 3) Goals scored; 4) Least red cards; 5) Least yellow cards; 6) Toss of a coin in an event of a tie of two clubs.

==== Results summary ====
Overall								Home						Away					
Pld	W	D	L	GF	GA	GD	Pts	W	D	L	GF	GA	GD	W	D	L	GF	GA	GD
26	9	8	9	45	43	+2	35	6	2	5	26	18	+8	3	6	4	19	25	−6

Last updated: 30 May 2021.
Source: Ultimate A-League

==== Matches ====
The 2020–21 A-League fixtures were announced on 24 November 2020.

30 December 2020 1	Western Sydney Wanderers	0–1	Macarthur FC	Sydney
19:10 AEDT		Report	Milligan 72'	Stadium: Bankwest Stadium; Attendance: 10,128; Referee: Kurt Ams

8 January 2021 3	Newcastle Jets	1–2	Western Sydney Wanderers	Newcastle
19:10 AEDT	Boogaard 72'	Report	Gordon 7'; Russell 57'	Stadium: McDonald Jones Stadium; Attendance: 5,374; Referee: Daniel Elder

16 January 2021 4	Sydney FC	1–1	Western Sydney Wanderers	Sydney
17:05 AEDT	Barbarouses 63' (pen.)	Report	Troisi 68'	Stadium: Stadium Australia; Attendance: 14,402; Referee: Alex King

19 January 2021 4	Central Coast Mariners	0–1	Western Sydney Wanderers	Gosford
19:00 AEDT		Report	Müller 83'	Stadium: Central Coast Stadium; Attendance: 4,659; Referee: Kurt Ams

29 January 2021 6	Western Sydney Wanderers	1–1	Newcastle Jets	Sydney
19:05 AEDT	Ibini 36'	Report	O'Donovan 81' (pen.)	Stadium: Bankwest Stadium; Attendance: 6,896; Referee: Ben Abraham

6 February 2021 7	Macarthur FC	2–2	Western Sydney Wanderers	Sydney
19:10 AEDT	Jovanovic 18'; Šušnjar 58'	Report	Dorrans 52'; Cox 71'	Stadium: Campbelltown Stadium; Attendance: 4,723; Referee: Shaun Evans

10 February 2021 7	Western Sydney Wanderers	2–0	Melbourne Victory	Sydney
19:05 AEDT	Dorrans 72' (pen.); Yeboah 88'	Report		Stadium: Bankwest Stadium; Attendance: 5,376; Referee: Alex King

21 February 2021 9	Wellington Phoenix	2–2	Western Sydney Wanderers	Wollongong
18:10 AEDT	Muratovic 9'; Fenton 79'	Report	Yeboah 71'; Kamau 77'	Stadium: WIN Stadium; Attendance: 3,383; Referee: Alireza Faghani

27 February 2021 10	Western Sydney Wanderers	2–3	Adelaide United	Sydney
17:05 AEDT	Kamau 61'; Duke 90'	Report	Goodwin 2'; Mauk 44'; Mo. Toure 82'	Stadium: Bankwest Stadium; Attendance: 8,456; Referee: Adam Kersey

2 March 2021 10	Western Sydney Wanderers	0–2	Melbourne City	Sydney
19:05 AEDT		Report	Maclaren 6', 54' (pen.)	Stadium: Bankwest Stadium; Attendance: 4,976; Referee: Shaun Evans

7 March 2021 11	Western United	0–1	Western Sydney Wanderers	Ballarat
18:00 AEDT		Report	Mutch 57'	Stadium: Mars Stadium; Attendance: 2,142; Referee: Alex King

15 March 2021 12	Western Sydney Wanderers	4–3	Wellington Phoenix	Sydney
19:05 AEDT	Wilmering 23'; Mutch 52'; Duke 65'; Yeboah 84'	Report	Dávila 7'; Devlin 32'; Hemed 64' (pen.)	Stadium: Bankwest Stadium; Attendance: 5,477; Referee: Shaun Evans

19 March 2021 13	Western Sydney Wanderers	3–0	Perth Glory	Sydney
19:05 AEDT	Duke 45', 47'; Troisi 52'	Report		Stadium: Bankwest Stadium; Attendance: 6,012; Referee: Daniel Elder

26 March 2021 14	Melbourne City	4–1	Western Sydney Wanderers	Melbourne
19:05 AEDT	Noone 33', 55'; Nabbout 52'; Maclaren 90+2'	Report	Ibini 22'	Stadium: AAMI Park; Attendance: 5,388; Referee: Alex King

3 April 2021 15	Brisbane Roar	1–1	Western Sydney Wanderers	Brisbane
19:10 ACDT	Danzaki 49'	Report	Yeboah 12'	Stadium: Moreton Daily Stadium; Attendance: 4,952; Referee: Alex King

6 April 2021 15	Western Sydney Wanderers	2–2	Central Coast Mariners	Sydney
19:05 ACDT	Kamau 74', 78'	Report	Simon 22'; Bozanic 83' (pen.)	Stadium: Bankwest Stadium; Attendance: 9,755; Referee: Chris Beath

10 April 2021 16	Adelaide United	1–1	Western Sydney Wanderers	Adelaide
19:10 AEST	Juric 11'	Report	Cox 68'	Stadium: Coopers Stadium; Attendance: 6,787; Referee: Daniel Elder

16 April 2021 17	Western Sydney Wanderers	1–2	Brisbane Roar	Sydney
19:05 AEST	Kamau 23'	Report	Brindell-South 18'; Danzaki 45+2'	Stadium: Bankwest Stadium; Attendance: 8,251; Referee: Alex King

23 April 2021 18	Melbourne Victory	5–4	Western Sydney Wanderers	Melbourne
17:00 AEST	Folami 14', 45+3'; Roux 28'; Ryan 63'; Butterfield 73'	Report	Troisi 31'; Dorrans 76' (pen.); Duke 86'; Müller 88'	Stadium: Marvel Stadium; Attendance: 3,235; Referee: Alireza Faghani

1 May 2021 19	Western Sydney Wanderers	3–2	Sydney FC	Sydney
19:10 AEST	Kamau 12'; Duke 16'; McDonald 74'	Report	Wilkinson 47'; Bobô 90+4'	Stadium: Bankwest Stadium; Attendance: 20,336; Referee: Shaun Evans

8 May 2021 20	Western Sydney Wanderers	5–0	Western United	Sydney
19:10 AEST	Troisi 19'; Gordon 36'; Kamau 57'; Pierias 66' (o.g.); Ibini 90'	Report		Stadium: Bankwest Stadium; Attendance: 7,539; Referee: Daniel Elder

16 May 2021 21	Perth Glory	5–1	Western Sydney Wanderers	Perth
18:15 AWST	Keogh 5', 24', 66' (pen.), 72'; Chianese 90+4'	Report	Kamau 49'	Stadium: HBF Park; Attendance: 4,510; Referee: Daniel Elder

23 May 2021 22	Sydney FC	1–0	Western Sydney Wanderers	Sydney
16:05 AEST	Bobô 62'	Report		Stadium: Sydney Cricket Ground; Attendance: 17,121; Referee: Chris Beath

26 May 2021 22	Western Sydney Wanderers	1–2	Wellington Phoenix	Sydney
19:05 AEST	Baccus 28'	Report	Ball 24'; Hemed 42'	Stadium: Bankwest Stadium; Attendance: 5,068; Referee: Kurt Ams

30 May 2021 23	Western Sydney Wanderers	2–0	Brisbane Roar	Sydney
16:05 AEST	Ibini 28'; Kamau 88'	Report		Stadium: Bankwest Stadium; Attendance: 6,531; Referee: Alireza Faghani

3 June 2021 24	Adelaide United	2–2	Western Sydney Wanderers	Adelaide
19:35 ACDT	Gordon 11' (o.g.); Goodwin 56'	Report	Strain 22' (o.g.); Dorrans 30'	Stadium: Coopers Stadium; Attendance: 6,103; Referee: Alex King

== Statistics ==
=== Appearances and goals ===
Players with no appearances not included in the list.

As of 5 June 2021

No.	Pos.	Nat.	Name	A-League		Total	
No.	Pos.	Nat.	Name	Apps	Goals	Apps	Goals
2	DF	(Scotland)	Ziggy Gordon	26	2	26	2
4	DF	(Australia)	Dylan McGowan	17	0	17	0
5	DF	(North Macedonia)	Daniel Georgievski	2(1)	0	2(1)	0
6	DF	(Australia)	Tass Mourdoukoutas	9(4)	0	9(4)	0
7	MF	(Australia)	Bruce Kamau	12(11)	9	12(11)	9
8	MF	(Australia)	Jordan O'Doherty	2(6)	0	2(6)	0
8	MF	(Australia)	Steven Ugarkovic	5(1)	0	5(1)	0
9	FW	(Australia)	Bernie Ibini	14(12)	4	14(12)	4
10	FW	(Republic of Ireland)	Simon Cox	8(6)	2	8(6)	2
11	FW	(Australia)	Kwame Yeboah	4(14)	4	4(14)	4
12	FW	(Australia)	Mitchell Duke	15(2)	6	15(2)	6
13	DF	(Australia)	Tate Russell	17(4)	1	17(4)	1
14	MF	(Australia)	James Troisi	19(5)	4	19(5)	4
17	MF	(Australia)	Keanu Baccus	19(5)	1	19(5)	1
18	MF	(Scotland)	Graham Dorrans	23	4	23	4
19	MF	(England)	Jordon Mutch	4(9)	2	4(9)	2
23	MF	(Australia)	Kosta Grozos	0(1)	0	0(1)	0
27	FW	(Germany)	Nicolai Müller	6(12)	2	6(12)	2
29	MF	(Australia)	Daniel Wilmering	12(2)	1	12(2)	1
30	GK	(Australia)	Daniel Margush	26	0	26	0
33	DF	(Australia)	Mark Natta	18(1)	0	18(1)	0
34	DF	(Germany)	Patrick Ziegler	7	0	7	0
39	DF	(Australia)	Thomas Aquilina	18(5)	0	18(5)	0
77	FW	(Australia)	Scott McDonald	0(7)	1	0(7)	1

=== Disciplinary record ===
As of 5 June 2021

Rank	No.	Pos	Nat	Name	A-League		Total	
Rank	No.	Pos	Nat	Name	Booked	Sent off (straight red)	Booked	Sent off (straight red)
1	18	MF	(Scotland)	Graham Dorrans	11	0	11	0
2	6	DF	(Australia)	Tass Mourdoukoutas	2	1	2	1
2	33	DF	(Australia)	Mark Natta	2	1	2	1
3	2	DF	(Scotland)	Ziggy Gordon	5	0	5	0
4	4	DF	(Australia)	Dylan McGowan	4	0	4	0
4	17	MF	(Australia)	Keanu Baccus	4	0	4	0
5	14	MF	(Australia)	James Troisi	3	0	3	0
5	19	MF	(England)	Jordon Mutch	3	0	3	0
6	7	FW	(Australia)	Bruce Kamau	2	0	2	0
6	10	FW	(Republic of Ireland)	Simon Cox	2	0	2	0
6	13	DF	(Australia)	Tate Russell	2	0	2	0
7	9	FW	(Australia)	Bernie Ibini	1	0	1	0
7	12	FW	(Australia)	Mitchell Duke	1	0	1	0
7	27	FW	(Germany)	Nicolai Müller	1	0	1	0
7	29	DF	(Australia)	Daniel Wilmering	1	0	1	0
7	34	DF	(Germany)	Patrick Ziegler	1	0	1	0

=== Clean sheets ===
As of 5 June 2021

Rank	No.	Pos	Nat	Name	A-League	Total
1	30	GK	(Australia)	Daniel Margush	6	6
