= 2019–20 Western Sydney Wanderers FC season =

Western Sydney Wanderers
2019–20 season
- Chairman: Paul Lederer
- Head Coach: Markus Babbel (until 20 January); Jean-Paul de Marigny (from 20 January)
- Stadium: Bankwest Stadium
- A-League: 9th
- A-League Finals: DNQ
- FFA Cup: Quarter-finals
- Top goalscorer: League: Mitch Duke (14); All: Mitch Duke (14)
- Highest home attendance: 28,519 vs. Sydney FC (26 October 2019); A-League
- Lowest home attendance: 9,090 vs. Perth Glory (19 January 2020); A-League
- Average home league attendance: 13,729
- Biggest win: 7–1 vs. Sydney United 58 (A) (28 August 2019); FFA Cup
- Biggest defeat: 0–3 vs. Melbourne City (A) (17 September 2019); FFA Cup
Home colours	Away colours

The 2019–20 Western Sydney Wanderers FC season was the club's eighth season since its foundation in 2012. The club participated in the A-League for the eighth time, and the FFA Cup for the sixth time.

On 24 March 2020, the FFA announced that the 2019–20 A-League season would be postponed until further notice due to the COVID-19 pandemic in Australia and New Zealand, and subsequently extended indefinitely. The season resumed on 17 July 2020.

== Players ==
=== Squad information ===
Note: Flags indicate national team as defined under FIFA eligibility rules; some limited exceptions apply. Players may hold more than one non-FIFA nationality.

No.	Pos.	Nation	Player
1	GK	SUI	Daniel Lopar
4	DF	AUS	Dylan McGowan (Vice-captain)
5	DF	MKD	Daniel Georgievski
6	DF	AUS	Matthew Jurman
7	FW	AUS	Mitchell Duke (Captain)
8	MF	AUS	Jordan O'Doherty
9	MF	GER	Nicolai Müller (Injury replacement)
10	FW	IRL	Simon Cox
11	FW	AUS	Bruce Kamau
13	DF	AUS	Tass Mourdoukoutas
16	DF	AUS	Mathieu Cordier
17	MF	AUS	Keanu Baccus
19	MF	SUI	Pirmin Schwegler

No.	Pos.	Nation	Player
20	GK	AUS	Vedran Janjetovic
22	MF	AUS	Nick Sullivan
23	MF	AUS	Kosta Grozos (Scholarship)
27	FW	AUS	Kwame Yeboah
28	MF	AUS	Fabian Monge (Scholarship)
29	DF	AUS	Daniel Wilmering (Scholarship)
31	DF	AUS	Noah Pagden (Scholarship)
33	DF	AUS	Tate Russell (Scholarship)
34	DF	GER	Patrick Ziegler
35	FW	SDN	Mohamed Adam (Scholarship)
40	GK	AUS	Nicholas Suman (Scholarship)
—	MF	POL	Radosław Majewski (injured)
—	GK	AUS	Tristan Prendergast (Injury replacement)

== Transfers ==
=== From youth squad ===
N	Pos.	Nat.	Name	Age	Notes
29	DF	(Australia)	Daniel Wilmering	18	2 year scholarship contract
35	FW	(Sudan)	Mohamed Adam	19	2 year scholarship contract
31	DF	(Australia)	Noah Pagden	18	2 year scholarship contract

=== Transfers in ===
No.	Position	Player	Transferred from	Type/fee	Contract length	Date	Ref
5	DF	(North Macedonia) Daniel Georgievski	Newcastle Jets	Free transfer	2 years	2 May 2019	
19	MF	(Switzerland) Pirmin Schwegler	(Germany) Hannover 96	Free transfer	1 year	15 May 2019	
1	GK	(Switzerland) Daniel Lopar	(Switzerland) St. Gallen	Free transfer	1 year	23 May 2019	
10	MF	(Poland) Radosław Majewski	(Poland) Pogoń Szczecin	Undisclosed	1 year	14 June 2019	
4	DF	Dylan McGowan	Unattached	Free transfer	3 years	19 June 2019	
22	MF	Nick Sullivan	Unattached	Free transfer	1 year	5 August 2019	
6	DF	Matthew Jurman	Unattached	Free transfer	1 year	6 September 2019	
14	FW	(Germany) Alexander Meier	Unattached	Free transfer	1 year	19 September 2019	
9	MF	(Germany) Nicolai Müller	(Germany) Eintracht Frankfurt	Injury replacement (Undisclosed fee)	1 year	16 October 2019	
10	FW	(Republic of Ireland) Simon Cox	Unattached	Free transfer	1.5 years	16 January 2020	
50	GK	Tristan Prendergast	Unattached	Injury replacement	1 month	2 July 2020	

=== Transfers out ===
No.	Position	Player	Transferred to	Type/fee	Date	Ref
4	DF	Josh Risdon	Western United	Free transfer	12 February 2019	
19	FW	Mark Bridge	Retired		12 March 2019	
10	MF	(Germany) Alexander Baumjohann	Unattached		27 April 2019	
9	FW	(Spain) Oriol Riera	Unattached		27 April 2019	
28	MF	(Curaçao) Roly Bonevacia	Unattached		29 April 2019	
24	DF	(Spain) Raúl Llorente	Unattached		3 May 2019	
16	FW	Jaushua Sotirio	Unattached	Free transfer	3 May 2019	
49	FW	Abraham Majok	Unattached	Free transfer	3 May 2019	
18	MF	Marc Tokich	Unattached	Free transfer	3 May 2019	
22	MF	Rashid Mahazi	Unattached	Free transfer	3 May 2019	
32	FW	John Roberts	Unattached	Free transfer	3 May 2019	
3	DF	Giancarlo Gallifuoco	Unattached	Loan return	3 May 2019	
5	DF	Brendan Hamill	Western United	Free transfer	15 May 2019	
7	FW	Nick Fitzgerald	Unattached	Undisclosed	18 June 2019	
30	GK	Danijel Nizic	Unattached	Mutual contract termination	25 November 2019	
14	FW	(Germany) Alexander Meier	Unattached	Mutual contract termination	16 January 2020	
21	DF	Tarek Elrich	Unattached	Mutual contract termination	24 January 2020	

=== Contract extensions ===
No.	Name	Position	Duration	Date	Notes
1	(Switzerland) Daniel Lopar	Goalkeeper	2 years	15 January 2020	
13	Tass Mourdoukoutas	Centre-back	3 years	18 February 2020	
33	Tate Russell	Right-back	1 year	6 March 2020	

=== Manager changes ===
Outgoing manager	Manner of departure	Date of vacancy	Position on table	Incoming manager	Notes
(Germany) Markus Babbel	Sacked	20 January 2020	9th	(Australia) Jean-Paul de Marigny	

== Pre-season and friendlies ==
20 July 2019	Western Sydney Wanderers (Australia)	1–2	(England) Leeds United	Parramatta, Australia
	Yeboah 48'	Report	Bogusz 9'; Hernández 90+5'	Stadium: Bankwest Stadium; Attendance: 24,419; Referee: Kurt Ams

25 July 2019	Gold Coast Knights (Australia)	0–5	(Australia) Western Sydney Wanderers	Gold Coast, Australia
		Report	Yeboah 4', 51'; Kamau 58', 82'; Majewski 90'	Stadium: Croatian Sports Centre

31 July 2019	Western Sydney Wanderers (Australia)	2–2	(Australia) Newcastle Jets	Sydney, Australia
	Kamau 12'; Georgievski 35'	Report	Hoffman; Thurgate	Stadium: Valentine Sports Park; Attendance: 0 (behind closed doors)

21 August 2019	Western Sydney Wanderers (Australia)	2–0	(Australia) Central Coast Mariners	Parramatta, Australia
	Schwegler 12'; Adam 25'	Report		Stadium: Bankwest Stadium; Attendance: 0 (behind closed doors)

11 September 2019	Western Sydney Wanderers (Australia)	1–1	(New Zealand) Wellington Phoenix	Sydney, Australia
	Baccus 80'	Report	Sotirio 56'	Stadium: Blacktown International Sportspark; Attendance: 0 (behind closed doors)

5 October 2019	Western United (Australia)	1–1	(Australia) Western Sydney Wanderers	Geelong, Australia
13:00 AEST	McDonald 2'	Report	Adam 80'	Stadium: GMHBA Stadium; Referee: Jonathan Barreiro

12 July 2020	Western Sydney Wanderers (Australia)	0–3	(New Zealand) Wellington Phoenix
		Report	Sotirio; Steinmann; DeVere

15 July 2020	Newcastle Jets (Australia)	0–0	(Australia) Western Sydney Wanderers	Lisarow, Australia
		Report		Stadium: Pluim Park

== Competitions ==
Win Draw Loss

=== Overview ===
Competition	First match	Last match	Starting round	Final position	Record							
Competition	First match	Last match	Starting round	Final position	Pld	W	D	L	GF	GA	GD	Win %
A-League	12 October 2019	12 August 2020	Matchday 1	9th	26	9	6	11	35	40	−5	34.62
FFA Cup	7 August 2019	17 September 2019	Round of 32	Quarter-finals	3	2	0	1	9	5	+4	66.67
Total					29	11	6	12	44	45	−1	37.93

Source: Soccerway

=== FFA Cup ===
7 August 2019 Round of 32	Perth Glory (Western Australia)	1–2 (a.e.t.)	(New South Wales) Western Sydney Wanderers	Perth
18:30 AWST	Mrcela 114'	Report	Adam 109'; Yeboah 117'	Stadium: Dorrien Gardens; Attendance: 1,587; Referee: Adam Fielding

28 August 2019 Round of 16	Sydney United 58 (New South Wales)	1–7	(New South Wales) Western Sydney Wanderers	Sydney
19:30 AEST	Antelmi 50' (pen.)	Report	Kamau 16'; Georgievski 22', 82'; Yeboah 37'; Bilic 57' (o.g.); Russell 72'; Majewski 79'	Stadium: Campbelltown Stadium; Attendance: 5,061; Referee: Kurt Ams

17 September 2019 Quarter-final	Melbourne City (Victoria (state))	3–0	(New South Wales) Western Sydney Wanderers	Melbourne
19:30 AEST	Noone 34', 81'; Maclaren 44'	Report		Stadium: AAMI Park; Attendance: 2,905; Referee: Stephen Lucas

=== A-League ===
==== League table ====
Pos	Team	Pld	W	D	L	GF	GA	GD	Pts	Qualification
1	Sydney FC (C)	26	16	5	5	49	25	+24	53	Qualification for 2021 AFC Champions League group stage and Finals series (Note: All Australian teams withdrew from the 2021 AFC Champions League on 4 June 2021.) (Note: The top two teams enter the Finals series at the semi-finals, while the teams ranked third to sixth enter the Finals series at the elimination-finals.)
2	Melbourne City	26	14	5	7	49	37	+12	47	Qualification for 2021 AFC Champions League qualifying play-offs and Finals series
3	Wellington Phoenix (Note: Wellington Phoenix cannot qualify for the 2021 AFC Champions League as they are not recognised as an AFC club.)	26	12	5	9	38	33	+5	41	Qualification for Finals series
4	Brisbane Roar	26	11	7	8	29	28	+1	40	Qualification for 2021 AFC Champions League qualifying play-offs and Finals series
5	Western United	26	12	3	11	46	37	+9	39	Qualification for Finals series
6	Perth Glory	26	10	7	9	43	36	+7	37	Qualification for Finals series
7	Adelaide United	26	11	3	12	44	49	−5	36	
8	Newcastle Jets	26	9	7	10	32	40	−8	34	
9	Western Sydney Wanderers	26	9	6	11	35	40	−5	33	
10	Melbourne Victory	26	6	5	15	33	44	−11	23	
11	Central Coast Mariners	26	5	3	18	26	55	−29	18	

Source: A-Leagues
Rules for classification: 1) points; 2) goal difference; 3) number of goals scored.
(C) Champions

==== Results summary ====
Overall								Home						Away					
Pld	W	D	L	GF	GA	GD	Pts	W	D	L	GF	GA	GD	W	D	L	GF	GA	GD
26	9	6	11	35	40	−5	33	5	4	4	18	16	+2	4	2	7	17	24	−7

Source: ultimatealeague.com

==== Result by round ====
Round	1	2	3	4	5	6	7	8	9	10	11	12	13	14	15	16	17	18	19	20	21	22	23	24	25	26	27	28	29
Ground	H	A	H	H	A	B	H	A	A	A	H	A	H	A	H	B	A	A	H	H	B	A	A	H	A	H	H	A	H
Result	W	W	W	D	L	✖	L	L	L	L	D	W	L	L	L	✖	W	W	D	W	✖	L	D	D	L	L	W	D	W
Position	2	2	1	2	3	3	4	4	6	7	8	7	8	8	9	9	8	8	8	7	7	8	8	–	–	–	–	–	9

Updated to match(es) played on 2 February 2020. Source: ultimatealeague.com
A = Away; H = Home; W = Win; D = Draw; L = Loss

==== Matches ====
12 October 2019 1	Western Sydney Wanderers	2–1	Central Coast Mariners	Sydney
17:00 AEDT	Duke 41', 82' (pen.)	Report	Đurić 36'	Stadium: Bankwest Stadium; Attendance: 17,091; Referee: Alireza Faghani

18 October 2019 2	Melbourne Victory	1–2	Western Sydney Wanderers	Melbourne
19:30 AEDT	Toivonen 72' (pen.)	Report	Baccus 54'; Meier 62'	Stadium: Marvel Stadium; Attendance: 17,231; Referee: Alex King

26 October 2019 3	Western Sydney Wanderers	1–0	Sydney FC	Sydney
19:30 AEDT	Duke 19'	Report		Stadium: Bankwest Stadium; Attendance: 28,519; Referee: Alireza Faghani

2 November 2019 4	Western Sydney Wanderers	0–0	Brisbane Roar	Sydney
17:00 AEDT		Report		Stadium: Bankwest Stadium; Attendance: 14,216; Referee: Daniel Elder

9 November 2019 5	Western United	2–1	Western Sydney Wanderers	Geelong
19:30 AEDT	Durante 13'; Appiah 58'	Report	Duke 5'	Stadium: GMHBA Stadium; Attendance: 4,558; Referee: Alex King

22 November 2019 7	Western Sydney Wanderers	2–3	Melbourne City	Sydney
19:30 AEDT	Yeboah 2', 80'	Report	Maclaren 56' (pen.), 90+2'; Brillante 73'	Stadium: Bankwest Stadium; Attendance: 12,078; Referee: Chris Beath

30 November 2019 8	Newcastle Jets	2–0	Western Sydney Wanderers	Newcastle
19:30 AEDT	Thurgate 78'; D. Petratos 86'	Report		Stadium: McDonald Jones Stadium; Attendance: 9,154; Referee: Kurt Ams

7 December 2019 9	Wellington Phoenix	2–1	Western Sydney Wanderers	Auckland
16:30 NZDT	Sotirio 48'; Dávila 89'	Report	Müller 64'	Stadium: Eden Park; Attendance: 8,851; Referee: Daniel Elder

14 December 2019 10	Perth Glory	2–0	Western Sydney Wanderers	Perth
18:45 AWST	Wüthrich 18'; Grant 66'	Report		Stadium: HBF Park; Attendance: 6,177; Referee: Alex King

20 December 2019 11	Western Sydney Wanderers	1–1	Western United	Sydney
19:30 AEDT	Ziegler 79'	Report	Calver 87'	Stadium: Bankwest Stadium; Attendance: 11,988; Referee: Alireza Faghani

27 December 2019 12	Adelaide United	2–3	Western Sydney Wanderers	Adelaide
19:00 ACDT	A. Toure 19'; Blackwood 90+4' (pen.)	Report	Müller 11', 59'; Adam 77'	Stadium: Coopers Stadium; Attendance: 8,846; Referee: Chris Beath

1 January 2020 13	Western Sydney Wanderers	1–2	Brisbane Roar	Sydney
19:30 AEDT	Duke 5'	Report	Neville 20'; Inman 61'	Stadium: Bankwest Stadium; Attendance: 11,482; Referee: Alex King

11 January 2020 14	Wellington Phoenix	2–0	Western Sydney Wanderers	Wellington
16:45 NZDT	Davila 15'; Cacace 88'	Report		Stadium: Sky Stadium; Attendance: 9,166; Referee: Adam Kersey

19 January 2020 15	Western Sydney Wanderers	0–1	Perth Glory	Sydney
18:30 AEDT		Report	Fornaroli 6'	Stadium: Bankwest Stadium; Attendance: 9,090; Referee: Adam Fielding

2 February 2020 17	Central Coast Mariners	1–3	Western Sydney Wanderers	Gosford
16:00 AEDT	Simon 82' (pen.)	Report	Müller 42'; Duke 76' (pen.); Cox 90+5'	Stadium: Central Coast Stadium; Attendance: 5,053; Referee: Shaun Evans

15 February 2020 19	Western Sydney Wanderers	1–1	Newcastle Jets	Sydney
19:30 AEDT	Duke 5' (pen.)	Report	Millar 74'	Stadium: Bankwest Stadium; Attendance: 9,864; Referee: Shaun Evans

21 February 2020 20	Western Sydney Wanderers	5–2	Adelaide United	Sydney
19:30 AEDT	Schwegler 5'; Müller 25'; Duke 27', 38'; Cox 11', 59'	Report	McGree 13' (pen.); Halloran 22'	Stadium: Bankwest Stadium; Attendance: 9,231; Referee: Alex King

28 February 2020 18	Sydney FC	0–1	Western Sydney Wanderers	Sydney
20:00 AEDT		Report	Duke 81'	Stadium: Netstrata Jubilee Stadium; Attendance: 18,501; Referee: Alireza Faghani

6 March 2020 22	Brisbane Roar	3–1	Western Sydney Wanderers	Brisbane
19:30 AEST	McDonald 3', 37'; O'Shea 72'	Report	Duke 54'	Stadium: Suncorp Stadium; Attendance: 8,349; Referee: Chris Beath

14 March 2020 23	Melbourne City	1–1	Western Sydney Wanderers	Melbourne
19:30 AEDT	Maclaren 30' (pen.)	Report	Russell 21'	Stadium: AAMI Park; Attendance: 2,292; Referee: Kate Jacewicz

21 March 2020 24	Western Sydney Wanderers	1–1	Sydney FC	Sydney
19:30 AEDT	Yeboah 82'	Report	Le Fondre 35'	Stadium: Bankwest Stadium; Attendance: 0 (behind closed doors); Referee: Shaun Evans

27 July 2020 28	Central Coast Mariners	1–1	Western Sydney Wanderers	Gosford
19:30 AEDT	Đurić 59'	Report	Cox 88'	Stadium: Central Coast Stadium; Attendance: 1,035; Referee: Chris Beath

31 July 2020 29	Western Sydney Wanderers	1–0	Wellington Phoenix	Sydney
19:30 AEDT	Yeboah 73'	Report		Stadium: Bankwest Stadium; Attendance: 2,194; Referee: Kurt Ams

4 August 2020 26	Western Sydney Wanderers	1–3	Perth Glory	Sydney
19:30 AEDT	Duke 63'	Report	Franjic 60'; Kilkenny 78' (pen.); Meredith 86'	Stadium: Bankwest Stadium; Attendance: 1,466; Referee: Kurt Ams

7 August 2020 25	Western United	5–3	Western Sydney Wanderers	Sydney
19:30 AEDT	Risdon 6'; Berisha 19'; Diamanti 52', 87'; Burgess 84'	Report	Duke 69', 82'; Mourdoukoutas 76'	Stadium: Netstrata Jubilee Stadium; Attendance: 0 Referee: Alireza Faghani

12 August 2020 27	Western Sydney Wanderers	2–1	Melbourne Victory	Sydney
20:10 AEDT	Schwegler 34'; O'Doherty 62'	Report	Nabbout 66'	Stadium: Bankwest Stadium; Attendance: 1,118; Referee: Ben Abraham

== Statistics ==
=== Appearances and goals ===
Includes all competitions. Players with no appearances not included in the list.

No.	Pos	Nat	Player	Total		A-League		FFA Cup	
No.	Pos	Nat	Player	Apps	Goals	Apps	Goals	Apps	Goals
1	GK	(Switzerland) SUI	Daniel Lopar	23	0	20	0	3	0
4	DF	(Australia) AUS	Dylan McGowan	26	0	23	0	3	0
5	DF	(North Macedonia) MKD	Daniel Georgievski	26	2	23	0	3	2
6	DF	(Australia) AUS	Matthew Jurman	24	0	24	0	0	0
7	FW	(Australia) AUS	Mitch Duke	26	14	26	14	0	0
8	MF	(Australia) AUS	Jordan O'Doherty	10	1	7+3	1	0	0
9	MF	(Germany) GER	Nicolai Müller	19	5	18+1	5	0	0
10	FW	(Republic of Ireland) IRL	Simon Cox	12	3	10+2	3	0	0
11	FW	(Australia) AUS	Bruce Kamau	17	1	9+5	0	3	1
13	DF	(Australia) AUS	Tass Mourdoukoutas	13	1	2+8	1	3	0
16	DF	(Australia) AUS	Mathieu Cordier	2	0	2	0	0	0
17	MF	(Australia) AUS	Keanu Baccus	23	1	19+1	1	3	0
19	MF	(Switzerland) SUI	Pirmin Schwegler	26	2	20+4	2	2	0
22	MF	(Australia) AUS	Nick Sullivan	16	0	7+8	0	0+1	0
23	MF	(Australia) AUS	Kosta Grozos	8	0	1+6	0	1	0
27	FW	(Australia) AUS	Kwame Yeboah	22	6	14+5	4	3	2
29	DF	(Australia) AUS	Daniel Wilmering	11	0	7+2	0	0+2	0
31	DF	(Australia) AUS	Noah Pagden	1	0	0+1	0	0	0
33	DF	(Australia) AUS	Tate Russell	18	2	11+4	1	0+3	1
34	DF	(Germany) GER	Patrick Ziegler	21	1	19+2	1	0	0
35	FW	(Australia) AUS	Mohamed Adam	22	2	5+14	1	2+1	1
36	FW	(Australia) AUS	Jarrod Carluccio	1	0	1	0	0	0
37	FW	(Australia) AUS	Jake Trew	1	0	0+1	0	0	0
40	GK	(Australia) AUS	Nicholas Suman	1	0	1	0	0	0
50	GK	(Australia) AUS	Tristan Prendergast	5	0	5	0	0	0
62	FW	(Australia) AUS	Ali Auglah	1	0	0+1	0	0	0
	MF	(Poland) POL	Radosław Majewski	3	1	0	0	3	1
Player(s) transferred out but featured this season
14	FW	(Germany) GER	Alexander Meier	14	1	8+4	1	1+1	0
21	DF	(Australia) AUS	Tarek Elrich	8	0	4+1	0	3	0

- Source: Soccerway

=== Disciplinary record ===
Includes all competitions. The list is sorted by squad number when total cards are equal. Players with no cards not included in the list.

No.	Pos	Nat	Player	Total			A-League			FFA Cup		
No.	Pos	Nat	Player	Yellow card	Second yellow card	Red card	Yellow card	Second yellow card	Red card	Yellow card	Second yellow card	Red card
5	DF	(North Macedonia) MKD	Daniel Georgievski	4	0	1	4	0	1	0	0	0
19	MF	(Switzerland) SUI	Pirmin Schwegler	9	0	0	9	0	0	0	0	0
34	DF	(Germany) GER	Patrick Ziegler	6	0	0	6	0	0	0	0	0
6	DF	(Australia) AUS	Matthew Jurman	5	0	0	5	0	0	0	0	0
17	MF	(Australia) AUS	Keanu Baccus	5	0	0	4	0	0	1	0	0
22	MF	(Australia) AUS	Nick Sullivan	4	0	0	4	0	0	0	0	0
4	DF	(Australia) AUS	Dylan McGowan	3	0	0	3	0	0	0	0	0
8	MF	(Australia) AUS	Jordan O'Doherty	3	0	0	3	0	0	0	0	0
10	FW	(Republic of Ireland) IRL	Simon Cox	3	0	0	3	0	0	0	0	0
7	FW	(Australia) AUS	Mitch Duke	2	0	0	2	0	0	0	0	0
9	MF	(Germany) GER	Nicolai Müller	2	0	0	2	0	0	0	0	0
35	FW	(Australia) AUS	Mohamed Adam	2	0	0	2	0	0	0	0	0
11	FW	(Australia) AUS	Bruce Kamau	1	0	0	1	0	0	0	0	0
13	DF	(Australia) AUS	Tass Mourdoukoutas	1	0	0	0	0	0	1	0	0
16	DF	(Australia) AUS	Mathieu Cordier	1	0	0	1	0	0	0	0	0
19	MF	(Switzerland) SUI	Pirmin Schwegler	1	0	0	0	0	0	1	0	0
23	MF	(Australia) AUS	Kosta Grozos	1	0	0	1	0	0	0	0	0
29	DF	(Australia) AUS	Daniel Wilmering	1	0	0	1	0	0	0	0	0
	MF	(Poland) POL	Radosław Majewski	1	0	0	0	0	0	1	0	0

- Source: Soccerway
- (yellow card) = Number of bookings; (second yellow card) = Number of sending offs after a second yellow card; (red card) = Number of sending offs by a direct red card.
