= A-League transfers for 2020–21 season =

This is a list of Australian soccer transfers for the 2020–21 A-League. Only moves featuring at least one A-League club are listed.

Clubs were able to sign players at any time, but many transfers will only officially go through on 1 June because the majority of player contracts finish on 31 May.

== Transfers ==
All players without a flag are Australian. Clubs without a flag are clubs participating in the A-League.

=== Pre-season ===
Date	Player	Moving from	Moving to
15 January 2020	Tommy Oar	Central Coast Mariners	Macarthur FC
5 June 2020	James Donachie	Melbourne Victory	Newcastle Jets
13 July 2020	(Switzerland) Pirmin Schwegler	Western Sydney Wanderers	Retired
28 July 2020	Denis Genreau	Melbourne City	Macarthur FC
30 July 2020	Adam Federici	Unattached	Macarthur FC
30 July 2020	Mark Milligan	Unattached	Macarthur FC
3 August 2020	(Poland) Radosław Majewski	Western Sydney Wanderers	Unattached
4 August 2020	(England) Matt Derbyshire	Unattached	Macarthur FC
11 August 2020	Andrew Nabbout	Melbourne Victory	Perth Glory
13 August 2020	Dimitri Petratos	Newcastle Jets	(Saudi Arabia) Al-Wehda
15 August 2020	(Panama) Abdiel Arroyo	Newcastle Jets	(Panama) Árabe Unido (end of loan)
20 August 2020	Mitchell Duke	Western Sydney Wanderers	(Saudi Arabia) Al-Taawoun
22 August 2020	Joel Chianese	Perth Glory	(India) Hyderabad
24 August 2020	Daniel Bowles	Brisbane Roar	Retired
26 August 2020	George Blackwood	Adelaide United	(England) Oldham Athletic
27 August 2020	(New Zealand) Liberato Cacace	Wellington Phoenix	(Belgium) Sint-Truiden
27 August 2020	(Albania) Migjen Basha	Melbourne Victory	Unattached
27 August 2020	Josh Hope	Melbourne Victory	Unattached
27 August 2020	(South Sudan) Kenny Athiu	Melbourne Victory	Unattached
27 August 2020	Benjamin Carrigan	Melbourne Victory	Unattached
27 August 2020	Giancarlo Gallifuoco	Melbourne Victory	Unattached
28 August 2020	Milislav Popovic	Unattached	Macarthur FC
31 August 2020	Yianni Perkatis	Perth Glory	(Australia) Sydney United
31 August 2020	Patrick Antelmi	Western United	(Australia) Sydney United
1 September 2020	Oskar Dillon	Western United	Unattached
1 September 2020	Thiel Iradukunda	Western United	Unattached
1 September 2020	Dino Djulbic	Perth Glory	Unattached
1 September 2020	Vince Lia	Perth Glory	Unattached
1 September 2020	Tando Velaphi	Perth Glory	Unattached
1 September 2020	(Serbia) Milan Đurić	Central Coast Mariners	Unattached
1 September 2020	(Brazil) Jair	Central Coast Mariners	Unattached
1 September 2020	(New Zealand) Michael McGlinchey	Central Coast Mariners	Unattached
1 September 2020	Jacob Melling	Central Coast Mariners	Unattached
1 September 2020	Nathaniel Atkinson	Melbourne City	Perth Glory
1 September 2020	Ivan Franjic	Perth Glory	Macarthur FC
4 September 2020	Samuel Silvera	Central Coast Mariners	(Portugal) Paços de Ferreira
6 September 2020	(New Zealand) Callum McCowatt	Wellington Phoenix	(Denmark) Helsingør
7 September 2020	Nicholas Suman	Western Sydney Wanderers	Macarthur FC
7 September 2020	Aaron Reardon	Brisbane Roar	Unattached
7 September 2020	Danny Kim	Brisbane Roar	(Australia) Lions FC (end of loan)
9 September 2020	Aiden O'Neill	(England) Burnley	Melbourne City
9 September 2020	(Spain) Juande	Perth Glory	Unattached
12 September 2020	Jacob Tratt	Perth Glory	(India) Odisha
13 September 2020	(England) Gary Hooper	Wellington Phoenix	(India) Kerala Blasters
14 September 2020	(England) Steven Taylor	Wellington Phoenix	(India) Odisha
21 September 2020	Brad Inman	Brisbane Roar	(India) ATK Mohun Bagan
21 September 2020	Marco Tilio	Sydney FC	Melbourne City
21 September 2020	Taras Gomulka	Adelaide United	Melbourne City
21 September 2020	Matt Sutton	Melbourne Victory	Melbourne City
23 September 2020	Nathaniel Atkinson	Perth Glory	Melbourne City
23 September 2020	Tomislav Mrcela	Perth Glory	Unattached
23 September 2020	Joshua Brillante	Melbourne City	(Greece) Xanthi
24 September 2020	(New Zealand) Callan Elliot	Wellington Phoenix	(Greece) Xanthi
24 September 2020	Andrew Nabbout	Perth Glory	Melbourne City
25 September 2020	Matthew Jurman	Western Sydney Wanderers	(Greece) Xanthi
26 September 2020	James Donachie	Newcastle Jets	(India) Goa (loan)
1 October 2020	(New Zealand) Max Crocombe	Brisbane Roar	Melbourne Victory
1 October 2020	Paul Izzo	Adelaide United	(Greece) Xanthi
1 October 2020	Dylan Ruiz-Diaz	Central Coast Mariners	Unattached
2 October 2020	Lachlan Wales	Melbourne City	Western United
2 October 2020	Dylan Fox	Central Coast Mariners	(India) NorthEast United
3 October 2020	Matthew Millar	Newcastle Jets	(England) Shrewsbury Town (loan)
5 October 2020	Domenic Costanzo	(Australia) Croydon Kings	Adelaide United
5 October 2020	Nikola Mileusnic	Adelaide United	(Denmark) Randers
6 October 2020	Lachlan Brook	Adelaide United	(England) Brentford
6 October 2020	Riley McGree	Adelaide United	(United States) Charlotte FC
6 October 2020	(Norway) Kristian Opseth	Adelaide United	Unattached
7 October 2020	(England) Adam Le Fondre	Sydney FC	(India) Mumbai City (loan)
7 October 2020	Aleksandar Šušnjar	Unattached	Macarthur FC
7 October 2020	Joe Gauci	Melbourne City	Adelaide United
8 October 2020	Moudi Najjar	Melbourne City	Macarthur FC (loan)
8 October 2020	Ramy Najjarine	Melbourne City	Newcastle Jets (loan)
8 October 2020	(China) Chen Yongbin	Adelaide United	Unattached
9 October 2020	Chris Harold	Central Coast Mariners	Retired
9 October 2020	Jake Brimmer	Perth Glory	Melbourne Victory
9 October 2020	Jake Hollman	Sydney FC Youth	Macarthur FC
9 October 2020	(Wales) Aaron Amadi-Holloway	Brisbane Roar	Unattached
12 October 2020	Jesse Daley	Unattached	Brisbane Roar
13 October 2020	(England) Callum McManaman	Unattached	Melbourne Victory
13 October 2020	Aleksandar Jovanovic	Unattached	Macarthur FC
13 October 2020	Josh Brindell-South	(Australia) Lions FC	Brisbane Roar
13 October 2020	Scott Neville	Brisbane Roar	(India) East Bengal (loan)
15 October 2020	Kristian Popovic	Perth Glory	(Greece) Xanthi
16 October 2020	Ben Garuccio	Unattached	Melbourne City
16 October 2020	Mathieu Cordier	Western Sydney Wanderers	Unattached
16 October 2020	Tristan Prendergast	Western Sydney Wanderers	Unattached
19 October 2020	(Germany) Matti Steinmann	Wellington Phoenix	(India) East Bengal
19 October 2020	Jordan Murray	Central Coast Mariners	(India) Kerala Blasters
19 October 2020	(France) Loïc Puyo	Unattached	Macarthur FC
19 October 2020	Brandon Wilson	Wellington Phoenix	Perth Glory
19 October 2020	(Republic of Ireland) Andy Keogh	Unattached	Perth Glory
20 October 2020	Joe Caletti	Unattached	Adelaide United
20 October 2020	Michael Neill	Newcastle Jets	(Australia) Rockdale City Suns
21 October 2020	Jonathan Aspropotamitis	Western United	Perth Glory
21 October 2020	Nick Sullivan	Western Sydney Wanderers	Perth Glory
21 October 2020	(Cyprus) Antonis Martis	(Denmark) Midtjylland	Macarthur FC (loan)
21 October 2020	Oliver Bozanic	Unattached	Central Coast Mariners
21 October 2020	Nick Fitzgerald	Newcastle Jets	(India) Jamshedpur
22 October 2020	Nick Ansell	Unattached	Melbourne Victory
23 October 2020	(Curaçao) Darryl Lachman	(Israel) Hapoel Ra'anana	Perth Glory
26 October 2020	(England) Jacob Butterfield	Unattached	Melbourne Victory
26 October 2020	Liam Rose	(Australia) Sydney United	Macarthur FC
26 October 2020	Michael Ruhs	(Australia) Sydney United	Macarthur FC
27 October 2020	Yaya Dukuly	Melbourne City	Adelaide United
28 October 2020	(New Zealand) Clayton Lewis	Unattached	Wellington Phoenix
28 October 2020	(New Zealand) James McGarry	Unattached	Wellington Phoenix
28 October 2020	Jake McGing	Brisbane Roar	Macarthur FC
29 October 2020	Ben Folami	(England) Ipswich Town	Melbourne Victory (loan)
29 October 2020	Gabriel Popovic	Perth Glory	(Greece) Xanthi
30 October 2020	Joshua Laws	Unattached	Wellington Phoenix
30 October 2020	Daniel Bouman	Unattached	Central Coast Mariners
30 October 2020	Joe Champness	Unattached	Brisbane Roar (loan from Newcastle Jets)
5 November 2020	Anthony Lesiotis	Melbourne Victory	Western Sydney Wanderers
6 November 2020	(New Zealand) Matthew Ridenton	Brisbane Roar	Wellington Phoenix
9 November 2020	(Scotland) Graham Dorrans	(Scotland) Dundee	Western Sydney Wanderers
10 November 2020	Mirza Muratovic	Brisbane Roar	Wellington Phoenix
10 November 2020	George Timotheou	Unattached	Adelaide United
10 November 2020	Danny Kim	(Australia) Lions FC	Brisbane Roar
10 November 2020	Tando Velaphi	Unattached	Perth Glory
11 November 2020	Daniel Margush	Perth Glory	Western Sydney Wanderers
11 November 2020	James Delianov	Western United	Adelaide United
11 November 2020	Dylan Ryan	(Netherlands) Willem II	Melbourne Victory (loan)
11 November 2020	Luke Bodnar	(Australia) ECU Joondalup	Perth Glory
11 November 2020	Daniel Stynes	(Australia) Gwelup Croatia	Perth Glory
13 November 2020	(Spain) Beñat	Unattached	Macarthur FC
15 November 2020	Phillip Cancar	(Croatia) Hrvatski Dragovoljac	Western Sydney Wanderers
18 November 2020	(Spain) Markel Susaeta	Unattached	Macarthur FC
18 November 2020	Gianluca Iannucci	Melbourne City	Melbourne Victory
19 November 2020	(Japan) Riku Danzaki	(Japan) Consadole Sapporo	Brisbane Roar (loan)
20 November 2020	Walter Scott	Wellington Phoenix	Macarthur FC
20 November 2020	Charles M'Mombwa	Unattached	Macarthur FC
20 November 2020	Yianni Nicolaou	Unattached	Macarthur FC
25 November 2020	(Spain) Javi López	Unattached	Adelaide United
25 November 2020	(Benin) Rudy Gestede	Unattached	Melbourne Victory
26 November 2020	Tomi Juric	Unattached	Adelaide United
26 November 2020	Antony Golec	Unattached	Macarthur FC
26 November 2020	Lachlan Rose	Unattached	Macarthur FC
27 November 2020	(Spain) Víctor Sánchez	Unattached	Western United
30 November 2020	(Israel) Tomer Hemed	Unattached	Wellington Phoenix
2 December 2020	(Austria) Richard Windbichler	Melbourne City	Unattached
3 December 2020	Ayom Majok	(Australia) Cumberland United	Western United
5 December 2020	(Japan) Naoki Tsubaki	(Japan) Yokohama F. Marinos	Melbourne City (loan)
8 December 2020	Tarek Elrich	Perth Glory	Unattached
9 December 2020	Stefan Nigro	Unattached	Central Coast Mariners
9 December 2020	James Meredith	Perth Glory	Macarthur FC
10 December 2020	(Japan) Masato Kudo	Unattached	Brisbane Roar
11 December 2020	(Switzerland) Daniel Lopar	Western Sydney Wanderers	Unattached
11 December 2020	(Japan) Kosuke Ota	(Japan) Nagoya Grampus	Perth Glory
11 December 2020	Alex Grant	Perth Glory	(South Korea) Pohang Steelers
14 December 2020	Valentino Yuel	Western United	Newcastle Jets
15 December 2020	James Troisi	Adelaide United	Western Sydney Wanderers
17 December 2020	(Scotland) Ziggy Gordon	Central Coast Mariners	Western Sydney Wanderers
17 December 2020	(Poland) Michał Janota	Unattached	Central Coast Mariners
17 December 2020	Bernie Ibini	Newcastle Jets	Western Sydney Wanderers
18 December 2020	Jaden Casella	(Australia) Rockdale City Suns	Central Coast Mariners
18 December 2020	(England) Ryan Shotton	Unattached	Melbourne Victory
18 December 2020	(Serbia) Stefan Janković	(Serbia) OFK Beograd	Central Coast Mariners
21 December 2020	Jack Duncan	Unattached	Newcastle Jets
22 December 2020	(Costa Rica) Marco Ureña	Unattached	Central Coast Mariners
22 December 2020	John Roberts	Central Coast Mariners	(Australia) Mt Druitt Town Rangers
26 December 2020	(Wales) Joe Ledley	Newcastle Jets	Unattached
27 December 2020	Stefan Zinni	(Australia) Avondale	Western United (loan)
29 December 2020	Mohamed Adam	Western Sydney Wanderers	Unattached
29 December 2020	Fabian Monge	Western Sydney Wanderers	Unattached
29 December 2020	Noah Pagden	Western Sydney Wanderers	Unattached
30 December 2020	Noah James	Newcastle Jets	Western Sydney Wanderers (loan)
30 December 2020	(Iraq) Ali Abbas	Unattached	Newcastle Jets
30 December 2020	Jack Armson	(Australia) Bonnyrigg White Eagles	Newcastle Jets
30 December 2020	Tete Yengi	(Australia) Adelaide Comets	Newcastle Jets
1 January 2021	(Brazil) Bobô	Unattached	Sydney FC
5 January 2021	Harrison Delbridge	Melbourne City	Unattached
8 January 2021	(Germany) Sebastian Langkamp	Unattached	Perth Glory
8 January 2021	Callum Timmins	(Australia) Balcatta	Perth Glory

=== Mid-season ===
Date	Name	Moving from	Moving to
5 January 2021	(England) Jordon Mutch	Unattached	Western Sydney Wanderers
14 January 2021	(Spain) Iker Guarrotxena	Unattached	Western United
15 January 2021	Matthew Millar	(England) Shrewsbury Town	Newcastle Jets (end of loan)
18 January 2021	(Portugal) Nuno Reis	(Bulgaria) Levski Sofia	Melbourne City
19 January 2021	Bon Scott	(Australia) Brisbane City	Brisbane Roar
22 January 2021	Golgol Mebrahtu	Unattached	Brisbane Roar
22 January 2021	Luka Pršo	(Croatia) Osijek	Newcastle Jets (loan)
27 January 2021	Apostolos Stamatelopoulos	Western United	Newcastle Jets
1 February 2021	Mitchell Duke	(Saudi Arabia) Al-Taawoun	Western Sydney Wanderers (loan)
5 February 2021	(Indonesia) Syahrian Abimanyu	(Malaysia) Johor Darul Ta'zim II	Newcastle Jets (loan)
5 February 2021	(Kosovo) Liridon Krasniqi	(Malaysia) Johor Darul Ta'zim II	Newcastle Jets (loan)
10 February 2021	Craig Goodwin	(Saudi Arabia) Al-Wehda	Adelaide United (loan)
15 February 2021	Bon Scott	Brisbane Roar	(Australia) Avondale
15 February 2021	Anton Mlinaric	Sydney FC	(Croatia) Dinamo Zagreb (loan)
17 February 2021	Charles Lokolingoy	Unattached	Wellington Phoenix
17 February 2021	Patrick Langlois	Newcastle Jets	(Australia) Hume City
18 February 2021	Josh Cavallo	Western United	Adelaide United
22 February 2021	Stefan Nikolic	Western Sydney Wanderers	(Australia) Marconi Stallions
23 February 2021	George Mells	Brisbane Roar	Unattached
26 February 2021	(England) Kaine Sheppard	Unattached	Western United
27 February 2021	Stefan Zinni	Western United	(Australia) Avondale (end of loan)
5 March 2021	(England) Steven Taylor	(India) Odisha	Wellington Phoenix
12 March 2021	Brad Inman	(India) ATK Mohun Bagan	Western United (loan)
22 March 2021	Jason Geria	Unattached	Perth Glory
24 March 2021	(New Zealand) Jai Ingham	Brisbane Roar	(Philippines) United City
26 March 2021	(Spain) Juande	(India) Kerala Blasters	Adelaide United
27 March 2021	Scott Neville	(India) East Bengal	Brisbane Roar (end of loan)
1 April 2021	Maki Petratos	Newcastle Jets	Unattached
12 April 2021	Bernardo Oliveira	Melbourne City	Adelaide United
12 April 2021	Joel Chianese	(India) Hyderabad	Perth Glory (loan)
12 April 2021	Dalibor Markovic	Melbourne Victory	Western United
21 April 2021	Anthony Lesiotis	Western Sydney Wanderers	Melbourne City
23 April 2021	(England) Adam Le Fondre	(India) Mumbai City	Sydney FC (end of loan)
28 April 2021	Scott McDonald	Brisbane Roar	Western Sydney Wanderers
28 April 2021	Patrick Flottmann	Sydney FC	Brisbane Roar (loan)
29 April 2021	(North Macedonia) Daniel Georgievski	Western Sydney Wanderers	Melbourne City
3 May 2021	(Indonesia) Syahrian Abimanyu	Newcastle Jets	(Malaysia) Johor Darul Ta'zim II (end of loan)
7 May 2021	Jordan O'Doherty	Western Sydney Wanderers	Newcastle Jets
7 May 2021	Steven Ugarkovic	Newcastle Jets	Western Sydney Wanderers
10 May 2021	Patrick Flottmann	Brisbane Roar	Sydney FC (end of loan)
11 May 2021	Antonee Burke-Gilroy	(Australia) Altona Magic	Brisbane Roar
12 May 2021	(Republic of Ireland) Simon Cox	Western Sydney Wanderers	Unattached
15 May 2021	(Kosovo) Liridon Krasniqi	Newcastle Jets	(Malaysia) Johor Darul Ta'zim II (end of loan)
20 May 2021	(England) Ryan Shotton	Melbourne Victory	Unattached
21 May 2021	Kyle Cimenti	(Australia) Rockdale Ilinden	Macarthur FC
27 May 2021	Danny Kim	Brisbane Roar	Unattached
3 June 2021	Lachlan Jackson	Newcastle Jets	Unattached
9 June 2021	(North Macedonia) Daniel Georgievski	Melbourne City	Unattached
10 June 2021	Domenic Costanzo	Adelaide United	Unattached

Player was released to free agency before joining new club
Champness returned to soccer from his retirement, following a stipulation that if he returned before June 2022 that he would re-join Newcastle Jets. After negotiations, Newcastle Jets agreed to loan him to Brisbane Roar for one season.
