= Jack Greenwood =

Jack Greenwood may refer to:

- Jack Greenwood (footballer), former Australian rules footballer
- Jack Greenwood (soccer) (born 1999), Australian soccer player
- Jack Greenwood (hurdler) (born 1926), American track and field athlete
