= Keanu Baccus =

Australian footballer

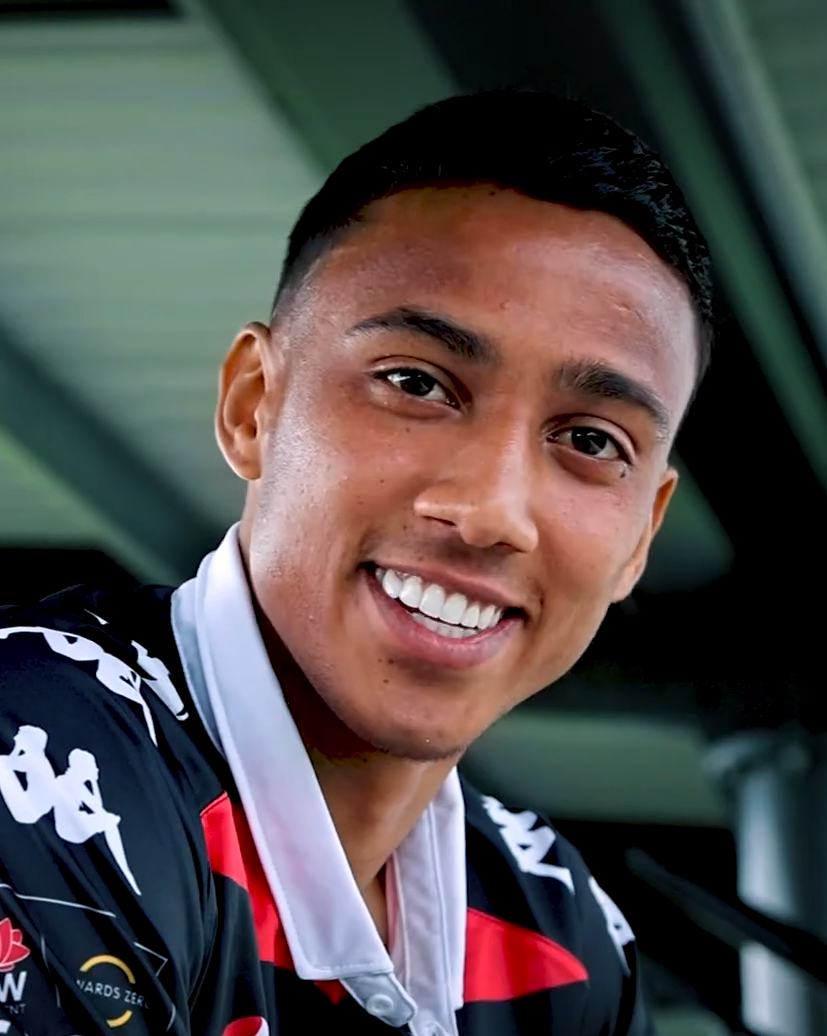
- Baccus with Western Sydney Wanderers in 2021

Personal information
- Full name: Keanu Kole Baccus
- Date of birth: 7 June 1998 (age 28)
- Place of birth: Durban, South Africa
- Height: 1.78 m (5 ft 10 in)
- Position: Defensive midfielder

Team information
- Current team: St Mirren
- Number: 25

Youth career
- Parklea SFC
- Fairfield Hotspurs
- Blacktown Spartans
- Blacktown City
- 2014–2016: Western Sydney Wanderers

Senior career*
| Years | Team | Apps | (Gls) |
| 2016–2017 | Western Sydney Wanderers NPL | 32 | (3) |
| 2016–2022 | Western Sydney Wanderers | 106 | (6) |
| 2022–2024 | St Mirren | 64 | (3) |
| 2024–2025 | Mansfield Town | 39 | (4) |
| 2025– | St Mirren | 16 | (1) |

International career^{‡}
| 2016 | Australia U20 | 5 | (1) |
| 2017–2021 | Australia U23 | 14 | (0) |
| 2022–2024 | Australia | 21 | (1) |
Medal record
Men's football
Representing Australia
AFC U-23 Asian Cup
| Third place | 2020 Thailand | U-23 Team |
AFF U-19 Youth Championship
| First place | 2016 Vietnam | U-20 Team |
- * Club domestic league appearances and goals as of 18 May 2026 ‡ National team caps and goals as of 19 November 2024

Keanu Kole Baccus (born 7 June 1998) is a professional footballer who plays as a defensive midfielder for Scottish Premiership club St Mirren. Born in South Africa, he is an international with the Australia national team, where he made his full international debut in September 2022.

== Early life ==
Baccus was born in Durban, South Africa but moved to Australia before his first birthday where his family settled in western Sydney. Baccus attended Kings Langley Public School where he was inspired by Socceroo Mark Schwarzer to participate in the sport. He is the younger brother of Kearyn Baccus.

== Club career ==
=== Western Sydney Wanderers ===
After rising from the Wanderers Academy to serve as co-captain of the youth team, Baccus signed a two-year senior contract in May 2017.

=== St Mirren ===
In April 2022, St. Mirren boss Stephen Robinson announced that Baccus was joining the Scottish Premiership club following the conclusion of the 2022 A League campaign. A few months later, the signing was confirmed by the club as a two-year deal. At the end of his contract, after 64 games and 3 goals for St. Mirren, Keanu decided his future lay elsewhere and decided not to sign a new contract.

=== Mansfield Town ===
On 22 May 2024 it was announced that he had joined Mansfield Town on a free transfer. The Stags had just been promoted from EFL League Two into EFL League One by finishing in an automatic promotion position in the 2023–24 season.

=== Return to St Mirren ===
On 7 August 2025, Baccus returned to St Mirren on a two-year deal with the option for a further year.

== International career ==
Baccus qualified for the Tokyo 2020 Olympics as part of the Australia under-23 team. The team beat Argentina in their first group match but were unable to win another match. They were therefore not in medal contention.

In September 2022, Baccus debuted for the senior national team as a second-half substitute in a friendly against New Zealand. On 8 November 2022, he was named in Australia's World Cup squad for the 2022 FIFA World Cup in Qatar. Baccus was used as a substitute in Australia's first three games in the tournament, before making his first senior international start in Australia's loss in the round of sixteen to Argentina.

== Career statistics ==
=== Club ===
As of match played 6 February 2026

Appearances and goals by club, season and competition
| Club | Season | League | | | National cup (Note: Includes Australia Cup, Scottish Cup, FA Cup) | | League cup (Note: Includes Scottish League Cup, EFL Cup) | | Continental | | Other | | Total | |
| Club | Season | Division | Apps | Goals | Apps | Goals | Apps | Goals | Apps | Goals | Apps | Goals | Apps | Goals |
|---|---|---|---|---|---|---|---|---|---|---|---|---|---|---|
| Western Sydney Wanderers | 2016–17 | A-League | 3 | 0 | 0 | 0 | — | | 1 (Note: Appearance in AFC Champions League) | 0 | — | | 4 | 0 |
| Western Sydney Wanderers | 2017–18 | A-League | 14 | 0 | 0 | 0 | — | | — | | — | | 14 | 0 |
| Western Sydney Wanderers | 2018–19 | A-League | 24 | 3 | 2 | 0 | — | | — | | — | | 26 | 3 |
| Western Sydney Wanderers | 2019–20 | A-League | 20 | 1 | 3 | 0 | — | | — | | — | | 23 | 1 |
| Western Sydney Wanderers | 2020–21 | A-League | 25 | 1 | 0 | 0 | — | | — | | — | | 25 | 1 |
| Western Sydney Wanderers | 2021–22 | A-League | 20 | 1 | 1 | 0 | — | | — | | — | | 21 | 1 |
| Western Sydney Wanderers | Total | | 106 | 6 | 6 | 0 | — | | 1 | 0 | — | | 113 | 6 |
| St Mirren | 2022–23 | Scottish Premiership | 33 | 2 | 2 | 0 | 1 | 0 | — | | — | | 36 | 2 |
| St Mirren | 2023–24 | Scottish Premiership | 31 | 1 | 1 | 0 | 4 | 1 | — | | — | | 36 | 2 |
| St Mirren | Total | | 64 | 3 | 3 | 0 | 5 | 1 | — | | — | | 72 | 4 |
| Mansfield Town | 2024–25 | League One | 34 | 2 | 2 | 0 | 0 | 0 | — | | 2 (Note: Appearances in EFL Trophy) | 0 | 38 | 2 |
| St Mirren | 2025–26 | Scottish Premiership | 13 | 1 | 0 | 0 | 4 | 0 | — | | — | | 17 | 1 |
| Career total | | | 217 | 12 | 11 | 0 | 9 | 1 | 1 | 0 | 2 | 0 | 240 | 13 |

=== International ===
As of match played 15 October 2024

Appearances and goals by national team and year
| National team | Year | Apps | Goals |
|---|---|---|---|
| Australia | 2022 | 5 | 0 |
| Australia | 2023 | 7 | 0 |
| Australia | 2024 | 9 | 1 |
| Total | | 21 | 1 |

Scores and results list Australia's goal tally first, score column indicates score after each Baccus goal.

List of international goals scored by Keanu Baccus
| No. | Date | Venue | Opponent | Score | Result | Competition | Ref. |
|---|---|---|---|---|---|---|---|
| 1 | 21 March 2024 | Western Sydney Stadium, Sydney, Australia | Lebanon | 1–0 | 2–0 | 2026 FIFA World Cup qualification | |

== Honours ==
St Mirren

- Scottish League Cup: 2025–26

Australia U20

- AFF U-19 Youth Championship: 2016
