= Kwame Yeboah (soccer) =

Australian soccer player

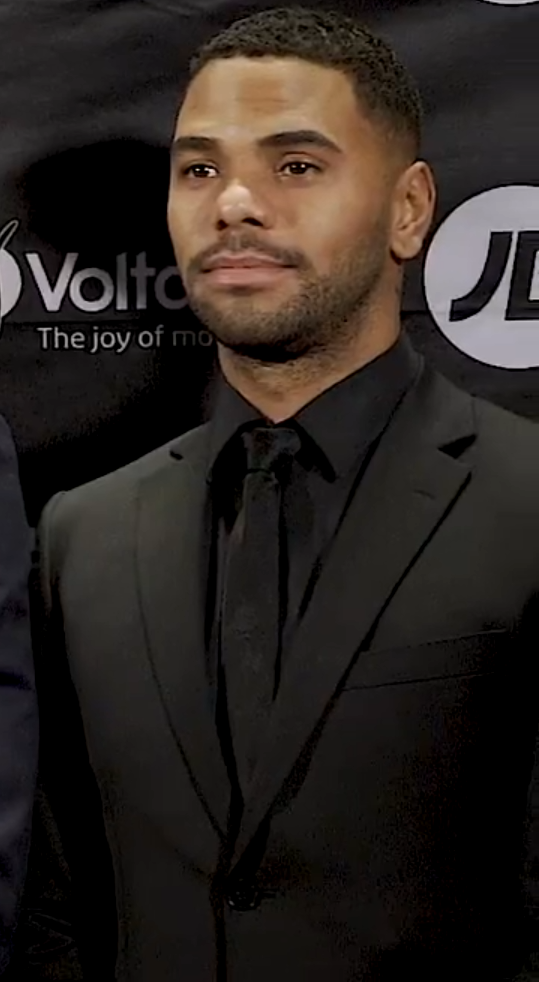
- Yeboah with Western Sydney Wanderers in 2021

Personal information
- Full name: Kwame Adzenyina Yeboah
- Date of birth: 2 June 1994 (age 32)
- Place of birth: Yirrkala, Northern Territory, Australia
- Height: 1.82 m (6 ft 0 in)
- Position: Forward

Youth career
- 2010–2012: QAS
- 2011–2012: Gold Coast United
- 2012–2014: Brisbane Roar

Senior career*
Years	Team	Apps	(Gls)
2013–2014	Brisbane Roar	12	(2)
2014–2018	Borussia Mönchengladbach II	53	(12)
2017–2018	Borussia Mönchengladbach	0	(0)
2018	→ SC Paderborn (loan)	11	(2)
2018–2019	Fortuna Köln	12	(1)
2019–2021	Western Sydney Wanderers	47	(10)
Total		135	(27)

International career
2010	Australia U17	1	(0)
2014	Australia U23	2	(0)
- * Club domestic league appearances and goals

Kwame Adzenyina Yeboah (born 2 June 1994) is an Australian former professional soccer player who played as a forward.

Yeboah played youth soccer with the Queensland Academy of Sport and Gold Coast United before making his professional debut for Brisbane Roar in 2013. In 2014, he moved to Germany to play for Borussia Mönchengladbach II. Following a loan at SC Paderborn and a move to Fortuna Köln, he returned to Australia joining Western Sydney Wanderers. He retired from soccer in October 2021, becoming a professional model.

Yeboah represented Australia at under-17 and under-23 levels.

== Early life ==
Yeboah was born in Yirrkala in Northern Territory, Australia to a Ghanaian father and Australian mother. He attended Varsity College on the Gold Coast and began playing junior soccer at the age of seven. He learned Capoeira in his younger years and often celebrated a goal in soccer with a back flip. He was offered a scholarship with the Queensland Academy of Sport in 2009 and spent several years with the team before Gold Coast United showed interest.

== Club career ==
=== Gold Coast United ===
Yeboah was signed by Gold Coast United in 2011. He spent the 2011–12 season playing with the Gold Coast's National Youth League team. The club folded in 2012 and Yeboah signed with Brisbane Roar.

=== Brisbane Roar ===
Yeboah made his first team debut for Brisbane in a semi final loss to Western Sydney Wanderers, coming on as an 83rd-minute substitute for winger Ben Halloran.

On 4 March 2013, it was announced that Yeboah had signed a Senior NYL contract to step up to the first team squad. Yeboah made his starting debut in Brisbane's 2–1 win away to Wellington Phoenix in the opening round of the 2013–14 A-League season. Six days later, Yeboah made his home debut in Brisbane's convincing 4–0 win against Sydney FC. He started the first four games of the 2013–14 season before Mike Mulvey relegated the young striker to the bench for the fifth-round game against 2012–13 champions Central Coast Mariners due to indifferent form. Yeboah came off the bench in the 87th minute to score his first goal for Brisbane in the 89th minute with a 1–0 win. He followed it up by scoring a goal the next week against Western Sydney Wanderers, celebrated with his back flip goal celebration.

=== Borussia Mönchengladbach ===
On 20 December 2013, Yeboah signed a four-year contract with Bundesliga side Borussia Mönchengladbach and officially moved in the January 2014 transfer window. He initially joined the reserve side. In his absence, Brisbane Roar went on to win the 2014 A-League Grand Final.

In May 2017, Yeboah extended his contract with Borussia Mönchengladbach for two more years.

In January 2018, Yeboah was loaned to SC Paderborn 07 until the end of the season.

=== Fortuna Köln ===
In July 2018, Yeboah joined 3. Liga club Fortuna Köln on a two-year contract.

=== Retirement ===
Yeboah retired from soccer in October 2021, signing a deal to become a professional model.

== International career ==
Yeboah is eligible to represent both Australia and Ghana in international competition. He has been called up several times for the Australian youth teams but has no senior debut for any country.

== Career statistics ==
=== Club ===
Appearances and goals by club, season and competition
Club	Season	League			Cup		Continental		Total	
Club	Season	Division	Apps	Goals	Apps	Goals	Apps	Goals	Apps	Goals
Brisbane Roar	2012–13	A-League	2	0	0	0	0	0	2	0
Brisbane Roar	2013–14	A-League	10	2	0	0	0	0	10	2
Brisbane Roar	Total		12	2	0	0	0	0	12	2
Borussia Mönchengladbach II	2013–14	Regionalliga West	10	0	0	0	0	0	10	0
Borussia Mönchengladbach II	2014–15	Regionalliga West	5	1	0	0	0	0	5	1
Borussia Mönchengladbach II	2015–16	Regionalliga West	5	0	0	0	0	0	5	0
Borussia Mönchengladbach II	2016–17	Regionalliga West	28	10	0	0	0	0	28	10
Borussia Mönchengladbach II	2017–18	Regionalliga West	5	1	0	0	0	0	5	1
Borussia Mönchengladbach II	Total		53	12	0	0	0	0	53	12
SC Paderborn (loan)	2017–18	3. Liga	11	2	0	0	0	0	11	2
Fortuna Köln	2018–19	3. Liga	12	1	0	0	0	0	12	1
Western Sydney Wanderers	2018–19	A-League	10	2	0	0	0	0	10	2
Western Sydney Wanderers	2019–20	A-League	19	4	3	2	0	0	22	6
Western Sydney Wanderers	2020–21	A-League	18	4	0	0	0	0	18	4
Western Sydney Wanderers	Total		47	10	3	2	0	0	50	12
Career total			135	27	3	2	0	0	138	29

== Honours ==
Borussia Mönchengladbach II

- Regionalliga West: 2014–15
