= Jack Greenwood (soccer) =

Australian soccer player

Personal information
- Date of birth: 4 August 1999 (age 27)
- Place of birth: Sydney, Australia
- Position: Goalkeeper

Team information
- Current team: Manly United
- Number: 20

Youth career
- 2014: APIA Leichhardt
- 2015–2017: GHFA Spirit

Senior career*
Years	Team	Apps	(Gls)
2017	GHFA Spirit	11	(0)
2018–2020	Western Sydney Wanderers NPL	20	(1)
2018–2020	Western Sydney Wanderers	2	(0)
2020–2021	NWS Spirit	18	(0)
2022	Manly United	29	(0)
2024–2025	NWS Spirit	0	(0)
- * Club domestic league appearances and goals as of 23 January 2025 ‡ National team caps and goals as of 20 April 2019

Jack Greenwood (born 4 August 1999) is an Australian former professional footballer who played as a goalkeeper for National Premier Leagues NSW club Manly United.

== Career ==
=== Western Sydney Wanderers ===
Raised in Cherrybrook, New South Wales, Greenwood played for Spirit FC and APIA Leichhardt in their junior squads, before signing for Western Sydney Wanderers in 2018. Greenwood was called-up to the first-team amid a squad crisis after Vedran Janjetović, Nicholas Suman, and Danijel Nizic were ruled out with injuries. He made his A-League debut at Central Coast Stadium on 20 April 2019 in a 3–1 defeat to Central Coast Mariners. Greenwood featured in the next match a week later, facing another 1–0 defeat away against Melbourne Victory.

During the COVID-19 pandemic in Australia, Greenwood departed Western Sydney Wanderers and later returned to NWS Spirit.

== Honours ==
=== Individual ===
- NPL NSW Men’s Goalkeeper of the Year: 2022
