= Patrick Ziegler =

German-Australian soccer player

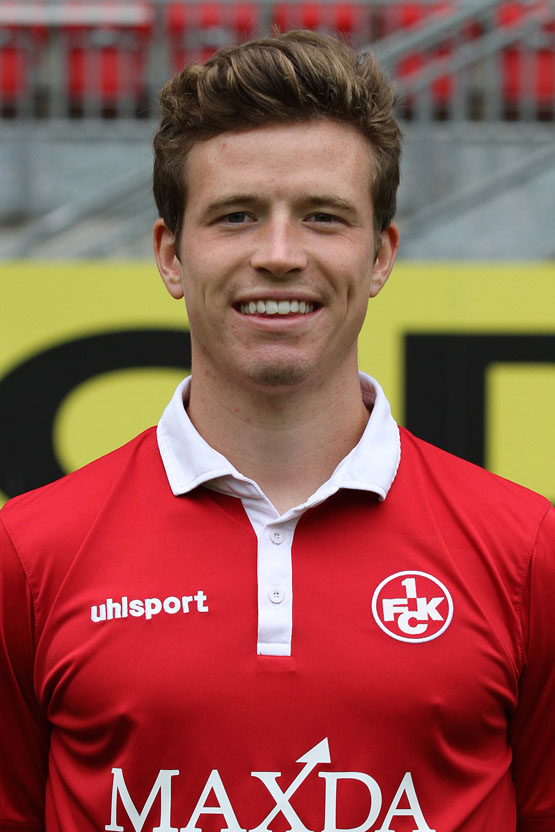
- Ziegler with 1. FC Kaiserslautern in 2015

Personal information
- Date of birth: 9 February 1990 (age 36)
- Place of birth: Gräfelfing, West Germany
- Height: 1.87 m (6 ft 2 in)
- Positions: Centre-back; defensive midfielder

Youth career
- –2003: TSV Moosach-Hartmannshofen
- 2003–2008: SpVgg Unterhaching

Senior career*
Years	Team	Apps	(Gls)
2008–2011	SpVgg Unterhaching II	9	(0)
2008–2012	SpVgg Unterhaching	51	(2)
2012–2015	SC Paderborn 07	70	(1)
2015–2018	1. FC Kaiserslautern	59	(0)
2018–2021	Western Sydney Wanderers	35	(1)
- * Club domestic league appearances and goals as of 25 June 2021

Patrick Ziegler (born 9 February 1990) is a German-Australian footballer who plays as a centre-back, most recently for the Western Sydney Wanderers.

== Career ==
Ziegler grew up in Munich, Germany and began his football career at junior club TSV Moosach-Hartmannshofen. At the age of 13 he moved to SpVgg Unterhaching to begin his youth academy training, and stayed at the club until age 21, playing for the club in the third tier 3. Liga, making a total of 51 league appearances and scoring 2 goals.

His performances attracted the attention of SC Paderborn 07, and he moved the 550 km distance from Munich in 2012. He played 3 seasons for Paderborn, being promoted to the Bundesliga after they finished 2nd in the 2013/14 2. Bundesliga season. The only season Ziegler played in the top flight Bundesliga saw the club relegated back to the 2nd tier, with Ziegler leaving the club at the end of the season having amassed 70 league appearances with a single goal. Paderborn were relegated again the season after Ziegler left the club. During his time at Paderborn he gave away a record breaking quick penalty against Hamburg, fouling Marcell Jansen just 8 seconds after kick-off.

Ziegler spent the next 3 years with Kaiserslautern. The club easily avoided relegation but could not push into a promotion position. Ziegler left having made 59 league appearances for the club.

Ziegler moved to Australia to play for the Western Sydney Wanderers starting in the 2018/19 A-League season on a three-year contract. After playing 6 games for the Wanderers he suffered a Tear of meniscus injury during an FFA Cup game that ended his 2018/19 season and caused him to only return in the 4th round of the 2019/20 season. He played the majority of the season with the Wanderers finishing in 9th place out of 11 teams. During this time at the Wanderers the club have gone through multiple managers, Markus Babbel, Jean-Paul de Marigny and then Carl Robinson. He was released from the club at the end of the 2020/21 season.

== Personal life ==
Patrick's father was born in Adelaide, South Australia, making him eligible to represent Germany, as well as Australia once he applies, and his application is approved, for citizenship by descent the Australian government. He would also no longer be regarded as a foreign player in the A-League, which has a limit of five such players per squad.

In January 2019, Ziegler declared that he wanted to play for Australia upon receiving his citizenship, adding that even after returning to Germany, his father still supported Australia, even more so than Germany. In October 2019, he told The Sydney Morning Herald that he was still waiting for permission from Germany to hold a second passport.

In December 2020, Zieger officially became an Australian citizen.
