= Fabian Monge =

Australian soccer player

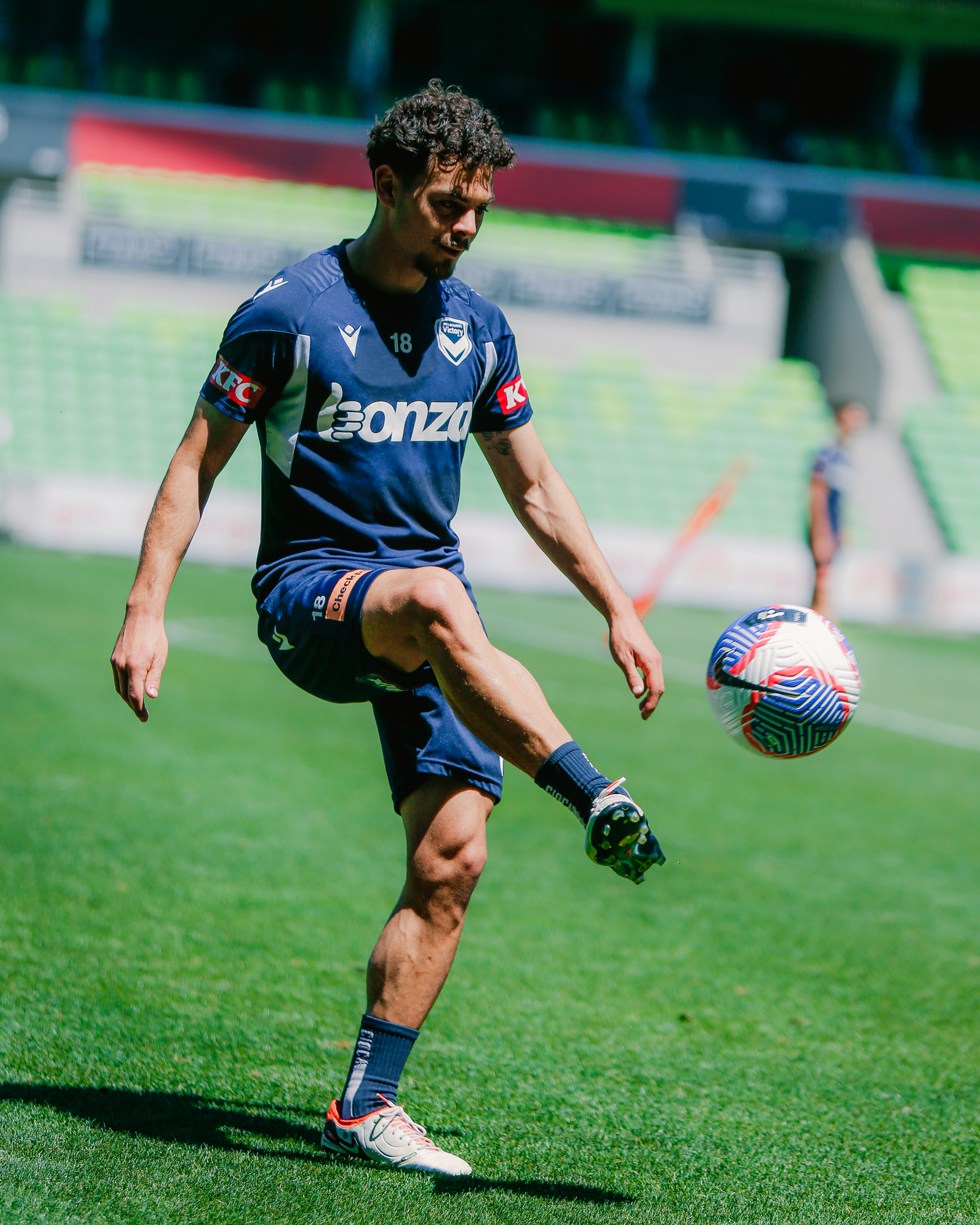
- Fabian Monge training for Melbourne Victory, December 2023

Personal information
- Full name: Fabian Andres Monge
- Date of birth: 12 July 2001 (age 25)
- Place of birth: Bossley Park, Australia
- Height: 1.77 m (5 ft 10 in)
- Position: Central midfielder

Team information
- Current team: APIA Leichhardt
- Number: 19

Youth career
- Mount Pritchard SC
- Marconi Stallions

Senior career*
| Years | Team | Apps | (Gls) |
| 2017 | Marconi Stallions | 9 | (0) |
| 2018–2020 | Western Sydney Wanderers NPL | 39 | (0) |
| 2019–2020 | Western Sydney Wanderers | 0 | (0) |
| 2021 | Sydney Olympic | 14 | (1) |
| 2021–2022 | Xanthi | 0 | (0) |
| 2022–2023 | APIA Leichhardt | 39 | (2) |
| 2023–2025 | Melbourne Victory | 33 | (0) |
| 2024–2025 | Melbourne Victory NPL | 1 | (0) |
| 2025– | APIA Leichhardt | 6 | (1) |

International career
| 2017 | Australia U17 | 6 | (0) |
| 2019– | Australia U20 | 7 | (2) |
| 2021– | Australia U23 | 2 | (0) |
Medal record
Men's football
Representing Australia
AFF U-19 Youth Championship
| First place | 2019 Vietnam | U-20 Team |
AFF U-16 Youth Championship
| First place | 2016 Cambodia | U-17 Team |
- * Club domestic league appearances and goals as of 14 June 2025

Fabian Andres Monge (born 12 July 2001) is an Australian professional soccer player who plays as a central midfielder for APIA Leichhardt in the NPL NSW.

== Career ==
=== Western Sydney Wanderers ===
Monge was part of the 2017-18 Y-League championship winning Western Sydney Wanderers Youth team. He played 71 minutes as they beat Melbourne City Youth 3–1 in the 2018 Y-League Grand Final on 3 February 2018.

On 8 February 2019, Monge signed his first professional contract with the Wanderers, penning a two-year scholarship deal with the club. After a standout 2018–19 Y-League campaign, which culminated in a 3–1 loss to Brisbane Roar Youth in the 2019 Y-League Grand Final, he was named the league's Player of the Year at the Dolan Warren Awards.

He made his professional debut on 18 September 2019 in a 2019 FFA Cup quarter-final clash against Melbourne City, replacing Mathieu Cordier in the 66th minute as the Wanderers went on to lose 3–0.

On 28 December 2020, The club announced that he had departed the club along with Mohamed Adam and Noah Pagden.

=== Sydney Olympic ===
On 21 January 2021, Sydney Olympic FC announced they had signed Monge.

== Honours ==
=== Club ===
Western Sydney Wanderers

- Y-League: 2017–18

=== International ===
Australia U20

- AFF U-19 Youth Championship: 2019

Australia U17

- AFF U-16 Youth Championship: 2016

=== Individual ===
- Y-League Player of the Year: 2018–19
