= Pirmin Schwegler =

Swiss footballer (born 1987)

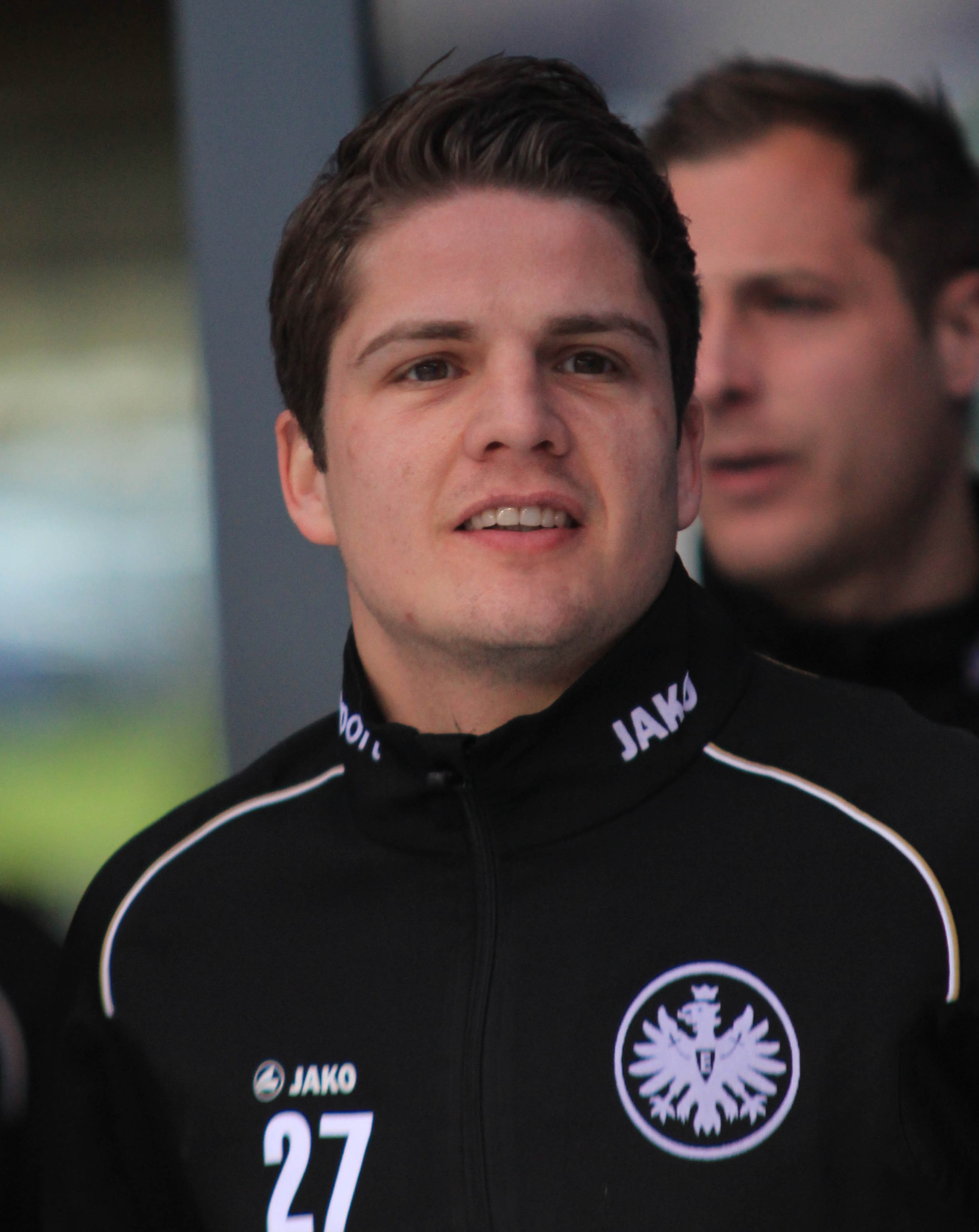
- Schwegler with Eintracht Frankfurt in 2012

Personal information
- Full name: Pirmin Schwegler
- Date of birth: 9 March 1987 (age 39)
- Place of birth: Ettiswil, Switzerland
- Height: 1.79 m (5 ft 10 in)
- Position: Midfielder

Youth career
- 1992–2002: FC Grosswangen
- 2002–2003: FC Luzern

Senior career*
Years	Team	Apps	(Gls)
2003–2005	FC Luzern	40	(3)
2005–2006	Young Boys	32	(1)
2006–2009	Bayer Leverkusen	46	(0)
2009–2014	Eintracht Frankfurt	128	(6)
2014–2017	TSG Hoffenheim	59	(1)
2017–2019	Hannover 96	56	(0)
2019–2020	Western Sydney Wanderers	24	(2)
Total		385	(13)

International career
2005–2008	Switzerland U21	20	(1)
2009–2014	Switzerland	14	(0)
- * Club domestic league appearances and goals

Pirmin Schwegler (born 9 March 1987) is a Swiss former footballer who played as a midfielder.

== Career ==
Schwegler began his career with FC Luzern. In summer 2005, he joined Young Boys. After just one year with Young Boys he signed with Bayer Leverkusen. On 18 July 2009, after three years with the "Werksclub", Schwegler signed with Eintracht Frankfurt. Schwegler, wearing the captain's armband for three years at Frankfurt, left the club in the 2014 summer transfer to join fellow Bundesliga side TSG Hoffenheim on a three-year deal.

He signed for Australian club Western Sydney Wanderers, on a one-year deal, for their upcoming 2019–20 season. Schwegler retired from football at the end of the 2019–20 A-League in August 2020.

== Personal ==
He is the brother of Christian Schwegler.

When he was 16-months-old, he was diagnosed with leukaemia. He was initially only given a 10% chance of survival. Doctors at the University of Bern Hospital's children's ward, led by Dr. Annette Ridolfi Luthy, fought to save him. The chemotherapy was successful but Schwegler had to go back to the clinic for regular check-ups throughout his childhood.
