= Jake Trew =

Australian soccer player

Personal information
- Full name: Jake Trew
- Date of birth: 13 September 1999 (age 27)
- Place of birth: Wollongong, Australia
- Position: Forward

Team information
- Current team: Wollongong Wolves

Youth career
- Wollongong Wolves

Senior career*
Years	Team	Apps	(Gls)
2017	Wollongong Wolves	2	(0)
2018–2020	Western Sydney Wanderers NPL	7	(0)
2019–2020	Western Sydney Wanderers	1	(0)
2021–2022	Blacktown City	6	(0)
2023–	Wollongong Wolves	59	(17)
- * Club domestic league appearances and goals as of 23 January 2025 ‡ National team caps and goals as of 7 August 2019

Jake Trew (born 13 September 1999) is an Australian professional soccer player who plays as a forward for Wollongong Wolves.
