= Tristan Prendergast =

Australian soccer player

Personal information
- Full name: Tristan Prendergast
- Date of birth: 27 June 1995 (age 31)
- Place of birth: Cairns, Queensland, Australia
- Position: Goalkeeper

Team information
- Current team: UNSW FC

Youth career
- Maryborough West
- Doon Villa
- Sydney FC

Senior career*
Years	Team	Apps	(Gls)
2014	Bonnyrigg White Eagles	16	(0)
2014–2019	Blacktown City		
2019	Sydney FC	0	(0)
2020	Blacktown City	3	(0)
2020	Western Sydney Wanderers	5	(0)
2021–2024	Blacktown City	45	(0)
2025	Sydney United 58	12	(0)
2026–	UNSW FC	15	(0)
- * Club domestic league appearances and goals as of 30 May 2026 ‡ National team caps and goals as of 31 July 2020

Tristan Prendergast (born 27 June 1995) is an Australian soccer player who plays as a goalkeeper for University of New South Wales (UNSW).

Prendergast was signed as cover by Western Sydney Wanderers in July 2020 following Daniel Lopar's return to Europe during the COVID-19 pandemic. He lost two, won two and drew one game playing for the Wanderers, keeping one clean sheet & conceding ten goals in the other games, including being lobbed twice on the same night by Alessandro Diamanti in a 5–3 loss to Western United.

Prendergast re-signed for Blacktown City in February 2021.
