= Noah Pagden =

Australian footballer

Personal information
- Full name: Noah Henry Pagden
- Date of birth: 20 March 2001 (age 25)
- Place of birth: Australia
- Height: 1.83 m (6 ft 0 in)
- Position: Defender

Youth career
- FNSW NTC
- 2016–2017: Western Sydney Wanderers

Senior career*
Years	Team	Apps	(Gls)
2017–2020	Western Sydney Wanderers NPL	44	(1)
2020	Western Sydney Wanderers	1	(0)
2022–	Central Coast United	10	(0)

International career^{‡}
2019–2020	Australia U-20	7	(0)
Medal record
Men's football
Representing Australia
AFF U-19 Youth Championship
First place	2019 Vietnam	U-20 Team
- * Club domestic league appearances and goals as of 28 February 2021 ‡ National team caps and goals as of 15 March 2020

Noah Henry Pagden (born 20 March 2001), is an Australian professional footballer who plays as a defender for Central Coast United.

== Club career ==
=== Western Sydney Wanderers ===
On 18 October 2019, Pagden signed his first professional contract with the club, penning a two-year scholarship deal. He made his professional debut as a second-half substitute in a Round 23 clash against Melbourne City, replacing Jarrod Carluccio in the 84th minute in a 1-1 draw.

On 28 December 2021, the club announced that Pagden had departed the club along with Mohamed Adam and Fabian Monge

=== Central Coast United ===
On 7 January 2022, Central Coast United announced the signing of Pagden for the 2022 NSW League Two season. He made his debut for the club on 12 March 2022 against Macarthur Rams which ended as a 3–3 draw.

== Honours ==
=== International ===
Australia U20

- AFF U-19 Youth Championship: 2019
