= Nicolai Müller =

German footballer

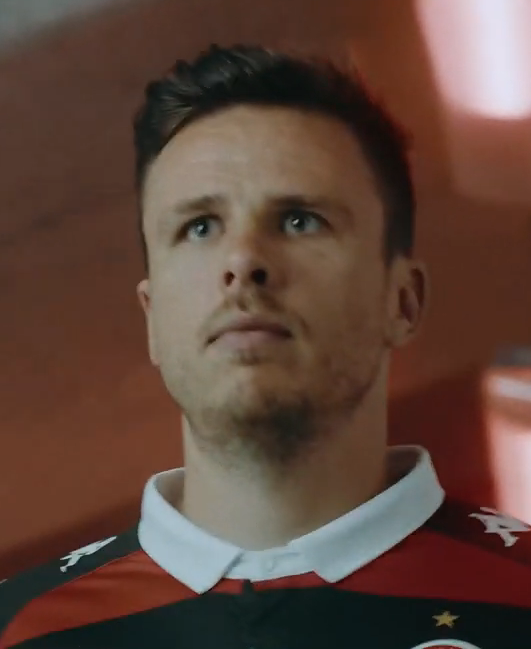
- Müller with Western Sydney Wanderers in 2020

Personal information
- Date of birth: 25 September 1987 (age 39)
- Place of birth: Lohr am Main, West Germany
- Height: 1.73 m (5 ft 8 in)
- Position: Winger

Youth career
- TSV Wernfeld
- 1998–2003: Eintracht Frankfurt
- 2003–2006: Greuther Fürth

Senior career*
Years	Team	Apps	(Gls)
2006–2010	Greuther Fürth II	64	(16)
2006–2011	Greuther Fürth	69	(13)
2008–2009	→ SV Sandhausen (loan)	18	(5)
2011	Mainz 05 II	1	(1)
2011–2014	Mainz 05	81	(21)
2014–2018	Hamburger SV	83	(16)
2018–2019	Eintracht Frankfurt	7	(2)
2019	→ Hannover 96 (loan)	14	(3)
2019–2021	Western Sydney Wanderers	37	(7)
2021–2022	Central Coast Mariners	18	(2)
2023–2024	Hills United	52	(7)

International career^{‡}
2013	Germany	2	(0)

Managerial career
- 2023–2024: Central Coast Mariners (assistant)
- 2025–: Bulls FC Academy
- * Club domestic league appearances and goals as of 25 November 2024 ‡ National team caps and goals as of 2 June 2013

Nicolai Müller (born 25 September 1987) is a German former professional footballer who currently coaches Bulls FC Academy in the NSW NPL League One.

== Club career ==
=== Early career ===
Müller began his career with TSV Wernfeld aged 11. In 1998, he joined Eintracht Frankfurt who had just won the 2. Bundesliga. He played for Die Adler until 2003, when he joined SpVgg Greuther Fürth.

=== Greuther Fürth ===
In 2006, Müller moved up to Greuther Fürth II in the Bayernliga. He would play for Fürth's reserves for the next three years until midway through the 2008–09 season, when he was loaned out to 3. Liga side SV Sandhausen, who he helped to an eighth-place finish in the first ever 3. Liga campaign. For the next season, Müller returned to Greuther Fürth. He finally broke into the first team with the Cloverleaves in the 2009–10 season and continued to play for the first team in 2010–11. This would be his last year with Fürth, though they finished fourth, as at the end of the season Müller joined Mainz 05.

=== Mainz 05 ===
Müller signed a contract lasting until 2015 with the Bundesliga club. His debut came against Hannover 96 in August as a substitute for Eric Maxim Choupo-Moting in the last minute. His first start came three games later against Borussia Dortmund and he scored his first Bundesliga goal.

=== Hamburger SV ===
On 6 August 2014, Müller joined Hamburger SV signing a four-year contract. His debut for HSV came on the third matchday against Hannover 96 in the 2–0 loss at the HDI-Arena. After the game, Hamburg coach Mirko Slomka left the club and Josef Zinnbauer took charge for the next match against Bayern Munich, in which Müller started and received his first booking for a 59th-minute foul on Dante.

Müller scored Hamburg's first goal of the 2014–15 season when he equalised against Eintracht Frankfurt on 28 September 2014. HSV eventually lost the game to a Lucas Piazon free-kick in the last minute.

HSV avoided relegation through the relegation play off for the second successive season in Müller's debut year, as he came on as a substitute and scored a 115th-minute winner during the relegation play-off game that took place at the end of the Bundesliga season, against Karlsruher SC. Müller's goal ensured that HSV would stay in the Bundesliga for the next year, keeping their unique status as the only team to have played in the Bundesliga for every year since its formation, as they won 3–2 on aggregate.

On 20 August 2017, the first matchday of the 2017–18 Bundesliga season, Müller got injured while celebrating scoring a goal against FC Augsburg. Medical examination confirmed that the striker had ruptured the ACL in his right knee and would be out for approximately seven months. He returned to the pitch on matchday 33, in a 3–0 defeat away to Eintracht Frankfurt.

=== Eintracht Frankfurt ===
After the 2017–18 season Hamburger SV got relegated from the Bundesliga and Müller joined Eintracht Frankfurt on a free transfer signing a two-year contract until summer 2020. On 30 December 2018, it was announced that Müller would be loaned out to Hannover 96 for the remainder of the 2018–19 season.

=== Western Sydney Wanderers ===
In October 2019, Müller joined Australian club Western Sydney Wanderers as an injury replacement for Radosław Majewski.

=== Central Coast Mariners ===
On 26 July 2021, Müller signed with Australian club Central Coast Mariners on a one-year deal. After his spell at the team in New South Wales he retired from pro football after 240 top-flight matches in Germany and Australia.

== International career ==
On 29 May 2013, Müller made his debut for Germany in a friendly match against Ecuador in Boca Raton, Florida, entering as a last-minute substitute for Lukas Podolski. He won his second and last cap in this same US tour of the DFB team.

== Career statistics ==
As of 6 June 2022

Appearances and goals by club, season and competition
Club	Season	League			Cup (Note: Includes DFB-Pokal)		Continental		Other		Total	
Club	Season	League	Apps	Goals	Apps	Goals	Apps	Goals	Apps	Goals	Apps	Goals
Greuther Fürth	2006–07	2. Bundesliga	2	0	0	0	—		—		2	0
Greuther Fürth	2007–08	2. Bundesliga	5	0	1	0	—		—		6	0
Greuther Fürth	2009–10	2. Bundesliga	29	6	4	1	—		—		33	7
Greuther Fürth	2010–11	2. Bundesliga	33	7	2	0	—		—		35	7
Greuther Fürth	Total		69	13	7	1	0	0	0	0	76	14
Greuther Fürth II	2006–07	Oberliga Bayern	35	10	—		—		—		35	10
Greuther Fürth II	2007–08	Oberliga Bayern	11	4	—		—		—		11	4
Greuther Fürth II	2008–09	Regionalliga Süd	16	1	—		—		—		16	1
Greuther Fürth II	2009–10	Regionalliga Süd	2	1	—		—		—		2	1
Greuther Fürth II	Total		64	16	0	0	0	0	0	0	64	16
SV Sandhausen (loan)	2008–09	3. Liga	18	5	—		—		—		18	5
Mainz 05 II	2011–12	Regionalliga West	1	1	—		—		—		1	1
Mainz 05	2011–12	Bundesliga	23	4	2	0	1 (Note: Appearance(s) in UEFA Europa League)	0	—		26	4
Mainz 05	2012–13	Bundesliga	32	8	4	1	—		—		36	9
Mainz 05	2013–14	Bundesliga	26	9	2	1	—		—		28	10
Mainz 05	Total		81	21	8	2	1	0	0	0	90	23
Hamburger SV	2014–15	Bundesliga	27	1	1	0	—		1 (Note: Appearance in relegation play-offs)	1	29	2
Hamburger SV	2015–16	Bundesliga	29	9	0	0	—		—		29	9
Hamburger SV	2016–17	Bundesliga	25	5	2	0	—		—		27	5
Hamburger SV	2017–18	Bundesliga	2	1	1	0	—		—		3	1
Hamburger SV	Total		83	16	4	0	0	0	1	1	88	17
Eintracht Frankfurt	2018–19	Bundesliga	7	2	1	0	4	0	–		12	2
Hannover 96 (loan)	2018–19	Bundesliga	14	3	0	0	–		—		14	3
Western Sydney Wanderers	2019–20	A-League	19	5	0	0	–		–		19	5
Western Sydney Wanderers	2020–21	A-League	18	2	0	0	–		–		18	2
Western Sydney Wanderers	Total		37	7	0	0	0	0	1	1	37	7
Central Coast Mariners	2021–22	A-League	17	2	1	0	–		1 (Note: Appearance in A-League Finals)	0	19	2
Career total			391	86	21	3	5	0	2	1	419	90
