= Matthew Jurman =

Australian soccer player

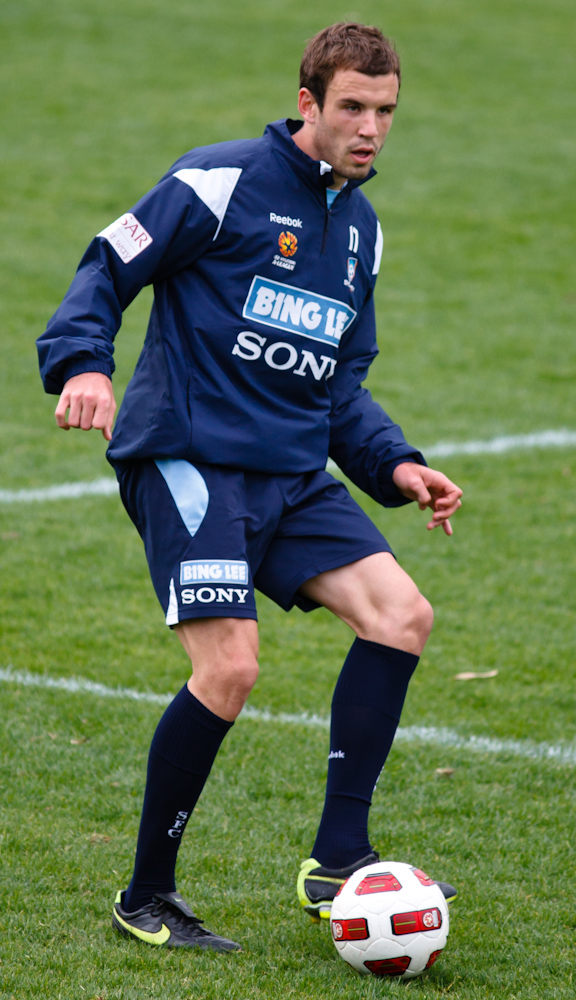
- Jurman training with Sydney FC

Personal information
- Full name: Matthew John Jurman
- Date of birth: 8 December 1989 (age 36)
- Place of birth: Wollongong, New South Wales, Australia
- Height: 1.90 m (6 ft 3 in)
- Position: Centre-back

Youth career
- Wollongong Wolves
- 2005–2006: Parramatta Eagles
- 2006–2007: AIS
- 2008–2011: Sydney FC

Senior career*
Years	Team	Apps	(Gls)
2007	AIS	11	(0)
2007–2008	Sydney Olympic	26	(2)
2008–2011	Sydney FC	22	(0)
2011–2013	Brisbane Roar	34	(0)
2013–2017	Sydney FC	74	(2)
2017–2018	Suwon Samsung Bluewings	28	(2)
2018–2019	Al-Ittihad	11	(0)
2019–2020	Western Sydney Wanderers	24	(0)
2020–2021	Xanthi	25	(0)
2021–2023	Newcastle Jets	42	(1)
2023–2026	Macarthur FC	41	(1)

International career^{‡}
2007–2009	Australia U20	26	(0)
2010–2012	Australia U23	6	(0)
2017–2019	Australia	8	(0)
- * Club domestic league appearances and goals as of 20 May 2026 ‡ National team caps and goals as of 7 June 2019

Matthew John Jurman (/ˈjɜːrmən/ YUR-mən; Croatian: [jûrman]) is an Australian soccer player who currently plays for Sutherland Sharks FC.

== Club career ==
=== Youth career ===
After graduating from Westfields Sports High School in 2007, Jurman furthered his football development at the AIS before signing for the Sydney FC youth team in 2008. In his first year at the club, Jurman helped Sydney FC to their first youth championship in the competition's inaugural campaign and later earned himself a senior deal at the club under then manager, John Kosmina.

=== Sydney FC ===
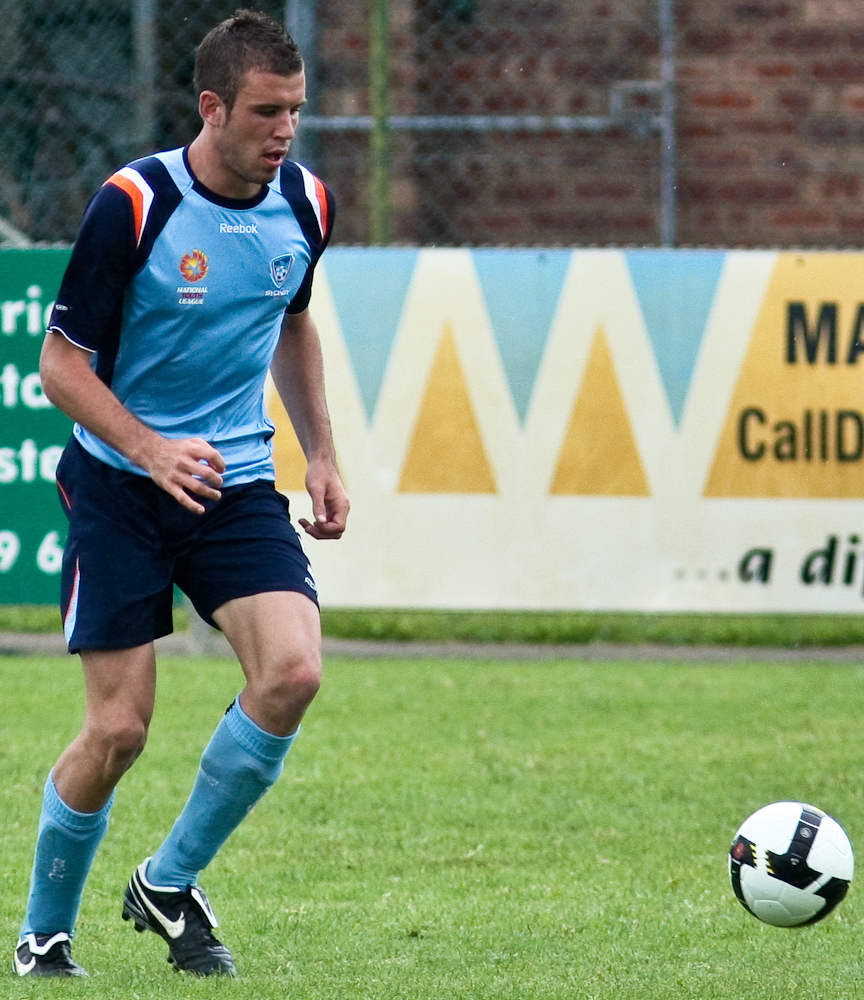
Jurman in 2008

Jurman made his senior debut for Sydney FC off the bench on 9 September 2007 against Perth Glory. Throughout his time at Sydney, he went on to make 22 appearances in the league as well as a number of appearances for the club in the 2011 Asian Champions League. He scored his only goal for Sydney in a 2–1 away loss to Kashima Antlers.

Along with a finish to the season where he became a first team regular, Jurman is remembered for an incident that occurred during the 2010–11 season after Sydney FC striker Juho Mäkelä scored a goal to put Sydney FC 2–0 ahead over Gold Coast United. Mäkelä jumped the fence to celebrate with the club's fans followed by the rest of the squad. During the jubilant celebrations, the fence collapsed and pinned Jurman's causing fears that he may have broken his leg. Jurman eventually played on and confirmed after the game that there was moderate swelling and bruising but no significant damage sustained.

=== Brisbane Roar ===
On 10 February 2011, it was confirmed Jurman had signed for A-League club Brisbane Roar on a two-year contract. He would be available for the beginning of the 2011–12 season. He won another league championship the first season and left after the second season to re join Sydney FC.

=== Return to Sydney FC ===
On 2 May 2013, Sydney FC announced that Jurman would be returning to the club for a second stint after signing a 1-year deal to join the Sky Blues. Jurman made his first appearance in the 2013–14 season for Sydney away to Melbourne Heart as a 64th-minute substitute for Brett Emerton in a game that Sydney FC won 2–0. On 8 March 2014 Jurman scored his first ever A-League goal with a 59th-minute header to level the Sydney Derby at 1–1 after Shinji Ono's opening goal. Sydney FC would go on to win the game 3–1, their first ever home derby win.

=== Suwon Samsung Bluewings ===
On 3 January 2017, Sydney FC confirmed that Jurman had been released, allowing him to join South Korean side Suwon Samsung Bluewings.

During Jurmans time with the Suwons he received the K-League Newcomer of the Year Award after a positive season with the team.

=== Al-Ittihad ===
On 9 July 2018, the Saudi Arabia Professional League team Al-Ittihad Club (Jeddah) announced Jurman would be joining them in Jeddah for the 2018–19 season.

== International career ==
Jurman was first called up to the Australian squad in August 2017. He made his senior international debut on 5 October 2017 against Syria in a 2018 World Cup qualifier which finished in a 1–1 draw. In May 2018 he was named in Australia's 23-man squad for the 2018 World Cup in Russia.

== Career statistics ==
As of 29 April 2023

Club	Season	League^{1}			Cup		Continental^{2}		Other		Total	
Club	Season	Division	Apps	Goals	Apps	Goals	Apps	Goals	Apps	Goals	Apps	Goals
Sydney FC	2007–08	A-League	1	0	—		—		—		1	0
Sydney FC	2008–09	A-League	6	0	—		—		—		6	0
Sydney FC	2009–10	A-League	7	0	—		—		—		7	0
Sydney FC	2010–11	A-League	8	0	—		6	1	—		14	1
Sydney FC	Total		22	0	—		6	1	—		28	1
Brisbane Roar	2011–12	A-League	19	0	—		3	0	—		22	0
Brisbane Roar	2012–13	A-League	15	0	—		—		—		15	0
Brisbane Roar	Total		34	0	—		3	0	—		37	0
Sydney FC	2013–14	A-League	21	1	—		—		—		21	1
Sydney FC	2014–15	A-League	17	1	2	0	—		—		19	1
Sydney FC	2015–16	A-League	25	0	2	0	7	0	—		34	0
Sydney FC	2016–17	A-League	11	0	5	0	—		—		16	0
Sydney FC	Total		74	2	9	0	7	0	—		90	2
Suwon Samsung Bluewings	2017	K League 1	25	2	0	0	3	0	—		28	2
Suwon Samsung Bluewings	2018	K League 1	4	0	0	0	1	0	—		5	0
Suwon Samsung Bluewings	Total		29	2	0	0	4	0	—		33	2
Al-Ittihad	2018–19	Saudi Pro League	11	0	1	0	6	0	—		18	0
Western Sydney Wanderers	2019–20	A-League	24	0	0	0	—		—		24	0
Xanthi	2020–21	Super League Greece 2	23	0	0	0	—		2	0	25	0
Newcastle Jets	2021–22	A-League Men	22	0	1	0	—		—		23	0
Newcastle Jets	2022–23	A-League Men	20	1	2	0	—		—		22	1
Newcastle Jets	Total		42	1	3	0	—		—		45	1
Career total			259	5	13	0	26	1	2	0	300	6

^{1} – includes A-League final series statistics
^{2} – AFC Champions League statistics are included in season ending during group stages (i.e. ACL 2007 and A-League season 2006–07 etc.); also includes 2005 OFC Club Championship statistics

== Personal life ==
Jurman's sister, Sam, is a soccer content creator.

== Honours ==
Sydney FC

- A-League Championship: 2009–10
- A-League Premiership: 2009–10

Brisbane Roar

- A-League Championship: 2012–13

Australia

- AFF U-19 Youth Championship: 2008

Individual

- Sydney FC Player of the Season: 2015–16
