= Nick Sullivan (soccer) =

Australian soccer player

Personal information
- Full name: Nicholas Sullivan
- Date of birth: 25 February 1998 (age 28)
- Place of birth: Canberra, Australia
- Position: Central midfielder

Team information
- Current team: APIA Leichhardt

Youth career
- Sutherland Sharks
- 2013–2015: Club Brugge
- 2015–2016: Western Sydney Wanderers
- 2016–2017: Vitória F.C.
- 2017–2018: Sutherland Sharks
- 2018–2019: Cova da Piedade

Senior career*
Years	Team	Apps	(Gls)
2018	Inter Lions	6	(4)
2019	St George City	6	(1)
2019–2020	Western Sydney Wanderers	15	(0)
2020–2021	Perth Glory	10	(0)
2021	Perth Glory NPL	7	(0)
2022–2023	Sutherland Sharks	26	(2)
2024–	APIA Leichhardt	0	(0)
- * Club domestic league appearances and goals as of 19 December 2023 ‡ National team caps and goals as of 7 August 2019

Nick Sullivan (born 25 February 1998) is an Australian professional soccer player who plays as a central midfielder for APIA Leichhardt.

== Career ==
=== Western Sydney Wanderers ===
On 7 August 2019, Sullivan made his professional debut against Perth Glory in the FFA Cup, with the Wanderers going on to win the match 2–1 in extra-time.

== Personal life ==
Born in Australia, Sullivan is of Mauritian descent.
