= Daniel Lopar =

Swiss footballer (born 1985)

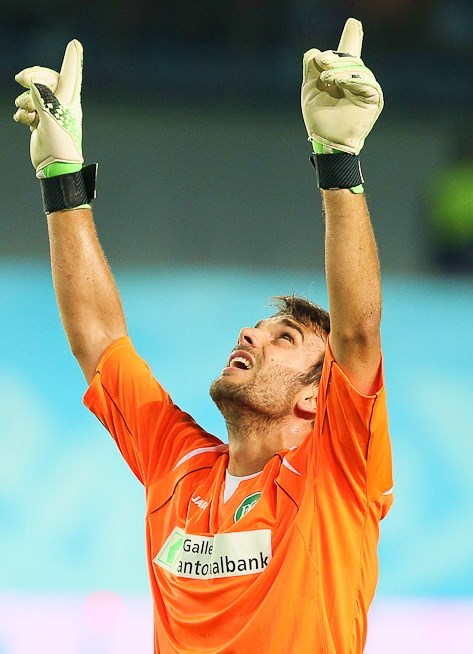
- Lopar playing for St. Gallen

Personal information
- Date of birth: 19 April 1985 (age 41)
- Place of birth: Kreuzlingen, Switzerland
- Height: 1.85 m (6 ft 1 in)
- Position: Goalkeeper

Senior career*
Years	Team	Apps	(Gls)
2003–2006	FC Wil 1900	46	(0)
2005	→ FC Aarau (loan)	0	(0)
2006	→ FC Thun (loan)	4	(0)
2006–2019	FC St. Gallen	282	(0)
2019–2020	Western Sydney Wanderers	20	(0)
2021	SC Brühl	10	(0)
- * Club domestic league appearances and goals as of 7 October 2022

Daniel Lopar (born 19 April 1985) is a Swiss football goalkeeper. He has most recently played for SC Brühl.

== Club career ==
=== Western Sydney Wanderers ===
23 May 2019, Western Sydney Wanderers (WSW) announced the signing of Daniel Lopar on a free transfer. Lopar started his first match for the Wanderers in the blockbuster pre-season friendly match against Leeds United. Daniel along with his WSW teammates were defeated 2-1 by Leeds thanks to a 95th-minute goal. Lopar made his competitive debut for Western Sydney, starting the match, in the FFA Cup round of 32. WSW defeated Perth Glory 2-1 and advanced to the round of 16. Daniel played his inaugural A-League match for Western Sydney in the Wanderers' 2-1 round one victory over Central Coast Mariners. Daniel made a number of crucial saves during the match.

15 January 2020, Lopar signed a new two-year contract extension keeping him at the club until the end of the 2021–22 A-League season. Although signing a new deal, on 11 December 2020 the club announced Lopar had departed.

== Career statistics ==
As of match played 18 October 2019

Season details			League		Cup		Continental		Other		Total	
Club	Season	League	Apps	Clsh	Apps	Clsh	Apps	Clsh	Apps	Clsh	Apps	Clsh
FC Wil 1900	2003–04	Super League	11	1	1	0	–	–	–	–	12	1
FC Wil 1900	2004–05	Challenge League	16	2	1	0	–	–	–	–	17	2
FC Wil 1900	2005–06	Challenge League	19	7	3	1	–	–	–	–	22	8
FC Aarau (loan)	2004–05	Super League	0	0	–	–	–	–	–	–	0	0
FC Thun (loan)	2005–06	Super League	4	1	–	–	–	–	–	–	4	1
Total			50	11	5	1	–	–	–	–	55	12
FC St. Gallen 1879	2006–07	Super League	2	1	–	–	–	–	–	–	2	1
FC St. Gallen 1879	2007–08	Super League	17	4	1	1	–	–	2 (Note: Swiss Super League Relegation Play-offs)	0	20	5
FC St. Gallen 1879	2008–09	Challenge League	29	15	4	3	–	–	–	–	33	18
FC St. Gallen 1879	2009–10	Super League	21	5	–	–	–	–	–	–	21	5
FC St. Gallen 1879	2010–11	Super League	10	2	–	–	–	–	–	–	10	21
FC St. Gallen 1879	2011–12	Challenge League	28	9	–	–	–	–	–	–	28	9
FC St. Gallen 1879	2012–13	Super League	35	10	–	–	–	–	–	–	35	10
FC St. Gallen 1879	2013–14	Super League	30	11	–	–	7 (Note: UEFA Europa League)	1	–	–	37	12
FC St. Gallen 1879	2014–15	Super League	17	3	3	1	–	–	–	–	20	4
FC St. Gallen 1879	2015–16	Super League	34	8	–	–	–	–	–	–	34	8
FC St. Gallen 1879	2016–17	Super League	32	5	–	–	–	–	–	–	32	5
FC St. Gallen 1879	2017–18	Super League	24	3	–	–	–	–	–	–	24	3
FC St. Gallen 1879	2018–19	Super League	3	1	–	–	–	–	–	–	3	1
Total			282	77	8	15	7	1	2	0	299	83
Western Sydney Wanderers	2019–20	A-League	2	0	3	0	–	–	–	–	5	0
Total			2	0	3	0	–	–	–	–	5	0
Career total			334	88	16	6	7	1	2	0	359	95
