= Nicholas Suman =

Australian soccer player

Personal information
- Date of birth: 28 February 2000 (age 26)
- Place of birth: Penrith, Australia
- Height: 1.94 m (6 ft 4 in)
- Position: Goalkeeper

Team information
- Current team: Ross County (on loan from Aberdeen)
- Number: 30

Youth career
- Colo Cougars
- Nepean
- Sydney United
- 2014–2015: FNSW NTC

Senior career*
Years	Team	Apps	(Gls)
2016–2020	Western Sydney Wanderers NPL	41	(0)
2016–2020	Western Sydney Wanderers	5	(0)
2020–2023	Macarthur	6	(0)
2021–2023	Northbridge	12	(0)
2023–2025	Cove Rangers	45	(0)
2025–	Aberdeen	1	(0)
2026–	→ Ross County (loan)	0	(0)

International career^{‡}
2016–2017	Australia U17	8	(0)
2021–	Australia U23	2	(0)
Medal record
Men's football
Representing Australia
AFF U-16 Youth Championship
First place	2016 Cambodia	U-17 Team
Third place	2015 Cambodia	U-17 Team
- * Club domestic league appearances and goals as of 20 May 2026 ‡ National team caps and goals as of 30 October 2021

Nicholas Suman (born 28 February 2000) is an Australian professional soccer player who plays as a goalkeeper for Scottish League One side Ross County, on loan from Scottish Premiership club Aberdeen.

== Club career ==
Suman's father had played briefly at National Soccer League level during the 1989–1990 season. Suman began playing for Colo Cougars, where he played until the age of 11. He then spent two years with Nepean FC, where he took up goalkeeping at 12. Suman was then signed to Sydney United and the Football New South Wales National Training Centre.

=== Western Sydney Wanderers ===
Suman was signed to the Western Sydney Wanderers youth team in 2015. He played five times for the Wanderers in his first National Youth League season. In 2016, Suman joined the Wanderers team in the National Premier Leagues NSW. In May 2017, Suman signed a one-year scholarship contract with the Wanderers. Aged 17, Suman was the youngest member of the Wanderers 2017–18 squad. After the 2017–18 season, Suman had trials with Rangers and Brighton & Hove Albion. In July 2018, his scholarship contract was extended by two years.

=== Macarthur FC ===
In September 2020, Suman joined new A-League club Macarthur ahead of their inaugural season.

=== Cove Rangers ===
After a trial, Suman signed a two-year contract with Scottish team Cove Rangers in 2023.

=== Aberdeen ===
Suman moved to Scottish Premiership club Aberdeen in May 2025. On 28 September 2026, Suman joined Scottish League One side Ross County on loan until the end of the season.

== International career ==
Suman holds Australia and United Kingdom passports.

Suman was part of the Australia team that won the 2016 AFF U-16 Youth Championship.

== Honours ==
Western Sydney Wanderers

- Y-League: 2017–18

Macarthur

- Australia Cup: 2022

Australia U20

- AFF U-16 Youth Championship: 2016
