= Mathieu Cordier =

Australian professional footballer

Personal information
- Full name: Mathieu Arthur Cordier
- Date of birth: 8 March 1999 (age 27)
- Place of birth: Australia
- Position: Left back

Team information
- Current team: Rockdale Ilinden

Youth career
- 2014–2015: FNSW NTC
- 2015: Manly United
- 2016: Western Sydney Wanderers

Senior career*
Years	Team	Apps	(Gls)
2016–2019	Western Sydney Wanderers NPL	39	(2)
2018–2020	Western Sydney Wanderers	3	(0)
2021	APIA Leichhardt	16	(1)
2022	Sydney Olympic	22	(0)
2023–	Rockdale Ilinden	48	(4)

International career^{‡}
2018	Australia U-20	2	(0)
- * Club domestic league appearances and goals as of 23 January 2025 ‡ National team caps and goals as of 30 October 2018

Mathieu Cordier (born 8 March 1999), is an Australian professional footballer who plays as a left back. He is currently signed to Rockdale Ilinden FC which complete in the National Premier Leagues NSW.

== Career ==
=== Western Sydney Wanderers ===
Cordier was part of the 2017-18 Y-League championship winning Western Sydney Wanderers Youth team. He played the full game as they beat Melbourne City Youth 3–1 in the 2018 Y-League Grand Final on 3 February 2018.

Cordier made his professional debut for Western Sydney Wanderers in the 2018 FFA Cup semi-final against Sydney FC on 6 October 2018, replacing Raúl Llorente in the 85th minute with the Wanderers going on to lose the game 3–0. He made his A-League debut on 18 January 2019, playing the full game as Western Sydney were downed 2-1 by Adelaide United at ANZ Stadium.

In October 2000, Cordier was on trial at English club Salford City F.C. However, he was unsuccessful to be signed by the club.

=== APIA Leichhardt ===
In February 2021, Cordier had signed to APIA Leichhardt.

=== Sydney Olympic FC ===
In September 2021, Cordier had signed at Sydney Olympic for 2022 National Premier Leagues NSW.

=== Rockdale Ilinden FC ===
In December 2022, Cordier had signed at Rockdale Ilinden for 2023 National Premier Leagues NSW. On 14 July 2024 he suffered a broken leg while playing in a match against Sydney United. After dribbling past an opponent, a sliding tackle from Liam McGing resulted in Cordier's leg being trapped between both legs of McGing, causing a complete break reminiscent of the injury to Eduardo da Silva in 2008. McGing was red carded, Cordier was stabilised and sent to hospital in an ambulance and the game delayed by an hour.

== Honours ==
Western Sydney Wanderers

- Y-League: 2017–18
