= Mohamed Adam =

Sudanese footballer (born 2000)

Personal information
- Full name: Mohamed Adam
- Date of birth: 5 August 2000 (age 26)
- Place of birth: Juba, Sudan
- Height: 1.78 m (5 ft 10 in)
- Position: Forward

Team information
- Current team: APEA Akrotiri
- Number: 17

Youth career
- Marconi Stallions

Senior career*
Years	Team	Apps	(Gls)
2017	Marconi Stallions	5	(1)
2018–2020	Western Sydney Wanderers NPL	43	(26)
2019–2020	Western Sydney Wanderers	19	(1)
2021	Sydney Olympic	13	(6)
2021–2022	Xanthi	0	(0)
2022	Imabari	2	(0)
2023	Port Melbourne	15	(2)
2023–2025	Green Gully	24	(5)
2026	Rockdale Ilinden	15	(2)
2026–	APEA Akrotiri		

International career^{‡}
2024–	Sudan	2	(0)
- * Club domestic league appearances and goals as of 22 July 2026 ‡ National team caps and goals as of 5 September 2025

Mohamed Adam (born 5 August 2000) is a Sudanese professional footballer who plays as a forward for APEA Akrotiri in Cypriot Second Division and the Sudan national team.

== Career ==
=== Western Sydney Wanderers ===
Adam was part of the 2017–18 Y-League championship winning Western Sydney Wanderers Youth team. He started and played 63 minutes as they beat Melbourne City Youth 3–1 in the 2018 Y-League Grand Final on 3 February 2018.

On 7 August 2019, Adam made his professional debut against Perth Glory in the 2019 FFA Cup, scoring the opening goal as the Wanderers won 2–1 in extra-time. He was subsequently awarded with a contract with the club on 9 August 2019, signing a two-year scholarship deal with the Wanderers.

On 23 September 2019, Adam was awarded the Wanderer's Youth Team Player of the Year having scored 21 goals in 21 games in their NPL NSW 2 campaign.

On 28 December 2020, the club announced that Adam had departed from the club

=== Sydney Olympic ===
On 21 January 2021, Sydney Olympic had announced that Adam had signed to the club.

== Honours ==
Western Sydney Wanderers

- Y-League: 2017–18
