= 2015–16 Western Sydney Wanderers FC season =

Western Sydney Wanderers
2015–16 season
- Chairman: Paul Lederer
- Manager: Tony Popovic
- Stadium: Pirtek Stadium, Parramatta
- A-League: 2nd
- A-League Finals Series: Runners-up
- FFA Cup: Quarter-finals
- Top goalscorer: League: Mitch Nichols, Brendon Santalab (10 goals); All: Brendon Santalab (11 goals)
- Highest home attendance: 19,627 vs Sydney FC; 16 January 2016
- Lowest home attendance: 9,860 vs Brisbane Roar; 5 December 2015
- Average home league attendance: 14,297
Home colours	Away colours

The 2015–16 Western Sydney Wanderers FC season was the club's fourth season since its establishment in 2012. The club participated in the A-League for the fourth time and the FFA Cup for the second time.

== Players ==
=== Squad information ===
Note: Flags indicate national team as defined under FIFA eligibility rules; some limited exceptions apply. Players may hold more than one non-FIFA nationality.

No.	Pos.	Nation	Player
2	DF	AUS	Shannon Cole
3	DF	AUS	Scott Jamieson
4	DF	AUS	Nikolai Topor-Stanley (captain)
5	DF	AUS	Brendan Hamill
6	MF	AUS	Mitch Nichols
7	FW	NED	Romeo Castelen
8	MF	ESP	Dimas
9	FW	ITA	Federico Piovaccari
10	MF	AUS	Dario Vidošić
11	FW	AUS	Brendon Šantalab
12	DF	AUS	Scott Neville
13	MF	AUS	Matt Sim
14	FW	AUS	Golgol Mebrahtu
15	MF	AUS	Kearyn Baccus

No.	Pos.	Nation	Player
16	FW	AUS	Jaushua Sotirio
17	MF	ESP	Alberto
18	MF	ESP	Andreu
19	FW	AUS	Mark Bridge (vice-captain)
20	GK	AUS	Andrew Redmayne
21	MF	AUS	Jacob Pepper
22	DF	AUS	Jonathan Aspropotamitis
23	DF	AUS	Shayne D'Cunha
30	GK	AUS	Liam Reddy
31	MF	AUS	Alusine Fofanah
32	DF	AUS	Daniel Alessi
33	FW	AUS	Josh Macdonald
36	FW	AUS	Liam Youlley
—	MF	AUS	Jackson Bandiera

=== From youth squad ===
N	Pos.	Nat.	Name	Age	Notes

=== Transfers in ===
No.	Pos.	Nat.	Name	Age	Moving from	Type	Transfer window	Ends	Transfer fee	Source
3	DF	(Australia)	Scott Jamieson	26	Perth Glory	Transfer	Pre-season	2017	Free	
12	DF	(Australia)	Scott Neville	26	Newcastle Jets	Transfer	Pre-season	2017	Free	
21	MF	(Australia)	Jacob Pepper	23	Newcastle Jets	Transfer	Pre-season	2017	Free	
20	GK	(Australia)	Andrew Redmayne	26	Melbourne City	Transfer	Pre-season	2017	Free	
18	MF	(Spain)	Andreu	32	(Spain) Racing de Santander	Transfer	Pre-season	2016	Free	
6	MF	(Australia)	Mitch Nichols	26	(Japan) Cerezo Osaka	Transfer	Pre-season	2017	Free	
9	FW	(Italy)	Federico Piovaccari	30	Free agent	Transfer	Pre-season	2016	Free	
8	MF	(Spain)	Dimas	32	Free agent	Transfer	Pre-season	2016	Free	
17	MF	(Spain)	Alberto	31	Free agent	Transfer	Pre-season	2016	Free	
10	MF	(Australia)	Dario Vidošić	28	(Switzerland) Sion	Transfer	Pre-season	2017	Free	
30	GK	(Australia)	Liam Reddy	34	Central Coast Mariners	Transfer	Round 10	2016	Free	
	MF	(Australia)	Jackson Bandiera	17	FFA Centre of Excellence	Transfer	Round 18	2018	Free	
13	MF	(Australia)	Matt Sim	27	Central Coast Mariners	Transfer	Round 18	2016	Free	

=== Transfers out ===
No.	Pos.	Nat.	Name	Age	Moving to	Type	Transfer window	Transfer fee	Source
15	MF	(Australia)	Yianni Perkatis	21	(Australia) Blacktown City	Released	Pre-season		
1	GK	(Australia)	Ante Covic	39		End of contract	Pre-season		
6	DF	(Australia)	Antony Golec	24		End of contract	Pre-season		
9	FW	(Australia)	Tomi Juric	23		End of contract	Pre-season		
12	FW	(Australia)	Nikita Rukavytsya	27		End of contract	Pre-season		
14	FW	(Australia)	Kerem Bulut	23		End of contract	Pre-season		
18	MF	(Italy)	Iacopo La Rocca	30		End of contract	Pre-season		
22	MF	(Australia)	Nick Ward	30		End of contract	Pre-season		
23	MF	(Australia)	Jason Trifiro	26		End of contract	Pre-season		
33	MF	(Australia)	Nick Kalmar	27		End of contract	Pre-season		
42	DF	(Australia)	Adrian Madaschi	32		End of contract	Pre-season		
3	DF	(Japan)	Yūsuke Tanaka	29		End of contract	Pre-season		
10	FW	(Japan)	Yojiro Takahagi	28		End of contract	Pre-season		
38	FW	(Australia)	Steve Kuzmanovski	18	Melbourne City	Transfer	Pre-season	Free	
13	DF	(Australia)	Matthew Spiranovic	27	(China) Hangzhou Greentown	Transfer	Pre-season	$1,000,000	
7	FW	(Australia)	Labinot Haliti	29	Newcastle Jets	Transfer	Pre-season	Free	
8	MF	(Croatia)	Mateo Poljak	25	Newcastle Jets	Transfer	Pre-season	Free	
25	DF	(Australia)	Sam Gallaway	23		Released	Pre-season		
1	GK	(Australia)	Dean Bouzanis	25	Melbourne City	Transfer	Round 14	Free	

== Technical staff ==
Position	Name
Head coach	(Australia) Tony Popovic
Assistant coach	(Spain) Andrés Carrasco
Assistant coach	(Australia) Hayden Foxe
Goalkeeping coach	(Australia) Zeljko Kalac
Strength & conditioning coach	(Australia) Scott Smith
Physiotherapist	(Australia) David Hughes

== Statistics ==
=== Squad statistics ===
N	Pos.	Nat.	Name	Total					A-League					FFA Cup
N	Pos.	Nat.	Name	Apps	Goals	Yellow card	Second yellow card	Red card	Apps	Goals	Yellow card	Second yellow card	Red card	Apps	Goals	Yellow card	Second yellow card	Red card
2	DF	(Australia)	Shannon Cole	4	0	0	0	0	0+4	0	0	0	0	0	0	0	0	0
3	DF	(Australia)	Scott Jamieson	32	0	5	0	0	29	0	4	0	0	3	0	1	0	0
4	DF	(Australia)	Nikolai Topor-Stanley	28	0	10	0	0	27	0	10	0	0	1	0	0	0	0
5	DF	(Australia)	Brendan Hamill	8	1	2	0	0	4+2	0	1	0	0	2	1	1	0	0
6	MF	(Australia)	Mitch Nichols	32	10	6	0	0	29	10	6	0	0	3	0	0	0	0
7	FW	(Netherlands)	Romeo Castelen	30	7	0	0	0	20+8	7	0	0	0	1+1	0	0	0	0
8	MF	(Spain)	Dimas	28	2	12	0	0	26	0	11	0	0	2	2	1	0	0
9	FW	(Italy)	Federico Piovaccari	14	2	2	0	0	10+2	2	1	0	0	2	0	1	0	0
10	MF	(Australia)	Dario Vidošić	29	4	3	0	0	17+11	4	3	0	0	0+1	0	0	0	0
11	FW	(Australia)	Brendon Šantalab	24	11	8	0	0	5+18	11	8	0	0	0+1	0	0	0	0
12	DF	(Australia)	Scott Neville	29	1	7	0	0	28	1	7	0	0	1	0	0	0	0
13	MF	(Australia)	Matt Sim	1	0	0	0	0	0+1	0	0	0	0	0	0	0	0	0
14	FW	(Australia)	Golgol Mebrahtu	8	1	1	0	0	1+6	0	1	0	0	1	1	0	0	0
15	MF	(Australia)	Kearyn Baccus	15	0	1	0	0	2+11	0	1	0	0	2	0	0	0	0
16	FW	(Australia)	Jaushua Sotirio	22	1	4	0	0	13+6	1	4	0	0	3	0	0	0	0
17	MF	(Spain)	Alberto	25	1	5	0	1	23	1	5	0	1	2	0	0	0	0
18	MF	(Spain)	Andreu	29	3	7	0	0	26+1	3	7	0	0	1+1	0	0	0	0
19	FW	(Australia)	Mark Bridge	26	9	3	0	0	21+3	9	3	0	0	2	0	0	0	0
20	GK	(Australia)	Andrew Redmayne	26	0	0	0	0	23	0	0	0	0	3	0	0	0	0
21	MF	(Australia)	Jacob Pepper	14	0	1	0	0	5+6	0	1	0	0	3	0	0	0	0
22	DF	(Australia)	Jonathan Aspropotamitis	5	0	1	0	1	4+1	0	1	0	1	0	0	0	0	0
23	DF	(Australia)	Shayne D'Cunha	0	0	0	0	0	0	0	0	0	0	0	0	0	0	0
30	GK	(Australia)	Liam Reddy	6	0	1	0	0	6	0	1	0	0	0	0	0	0	0
31	MF	(Australia)	Alusine Fofanah	0	0	0	0	0	0	0	0	0	0	0	0	0	0	0
32	DF	(Australia)	Daniel Alessi	1	0	1	0	0	0	0	0	0	0	1	0	1	0	0
33	FW	(Australia)	Josh Macdonald	5	0	1	0	0	0+2	0	0	0	0	0+3	0	1	0	0
34	FW	(Australia)	Mario Shabow	1	0	0	0	0	0+1	0	0	0	0	0	0	0	0	0
36	FW	(Australia)	Liam Youlley	3	0	0	0	0	0+1	0	0	0	0	0+2	0	0	0	0
	MF	(Australia)	Jackson Bandiera	0	0	0	0	0	0	0	0	0	0	0	0	0	0	0
Players no longer at the club:
1	GK	(Australia)	Dean Bouzanis	0	0	0	0	0	0	0	0	0	0	0	0	0	0	0

- Last updated: 1 May 2016
- Source: au.soccerway.com
- (yellow card) = Number of bookings; (second yellow card) = Number of sending offs after a second yellow card; (red card) = Number of sending offs by a direct red card.

== Pre-season and friendlies ==
29 July 2015	Mt Druitt Town Rangers (Australia)	0–3	(Australia) Western Sydney Wanderers	Sydney, Australia
19:30		Report	Bridge (?); Castelen (?); Ly (?)	Stadium: Popondetta Park; Referee: Kris Griffiths-Jones

7 August 2015	Central Coast Mariners (Australia)	3–2	(Australia) Western Sydney Wanderers	Coffs Harbour, Australia
19:15	Heffernan 52', 53', 56'	Report	Castelen 69'; Macdonald 77'	Stadium: C.ex Coffs International Stadium

7 August 2015	Canberra FC (Australia)	0–3	(Australia) Western Sydney Wanderers	Canberra, Australia
19:15		Report	Bridge 37'; Piovaccari 40'; Šantalab 65'	Stadium: Deakin Stadium

13 September 2015	Western Sydney Wanderers (Australia)	1–3	(New Zealand) Wellington Phoenix	Parramatta, Australia
18:00 AEST	Nichols 70'	Report	Bonevacia 8', 16'; Powell 85'	Stadium: Pirtek Stadium; Referee: Stephen Lucas

22 September 2015	APIA Leichhardt Tigers (Australia)	1–2	(Australia) Western Sydney Wanderers	Sydney, Australia
19:45 AEST	Milgate 81'	Report	Piovaccari 23'; Castelen 32' (pen.)	Stadium: Leichhardt Oval

== Competitions ==
=== Overview ===
Competition	First match	Last match	Starting round	Final position	Record							
Competition	First match	Last match	Starting round	Final position	Pld	W	D	L	GF	GA	GD	Win %
A-League	8 October 2015	10 April 2016	Matchday 1	2nd	27	14	6	7	44	33	+11	51.85
A-League Finals	24 April 2016	1 May 2016	Semi-finals	Runners-up	2	1	0	1	6	6	+0	50.00
FFA Cup	11 August 2015	29 September 2015	Round of 32	Quarter-finals	3	2	1	0	4	1	+3	66.67
Total					32	17	7	8	54	40	+14	53.13

Source: Competitions

=== A-League ===
==== League table ====
Pos	Team	Pld	W	D	L	GF	GA	GD	Pts	Qualification
1	Adelaide United (C)	27	14	7	6	45	28	+17	49	Qualification for 2017 AFC Champions League group stage and Finals series
2	Western Sydney Wanderers	27	14	6	7	44	33	+11	48	Qualification for 2017 AFC Champions League group stage and Finals series
3	Brisbane Roar	27	14	6	7	49	40	+9	48	Qualification for 2017 AFC Champions League second preliminary round and Finals series
4	Melbourne City	27	13	5	9	63	44	+19	44	Qualification for Finals series
5	Perth Glory	27	13	4	10	49	42	+7	43	Qualification for Finals series
6	Melbourne Victory	27	11	8	8	40	33	+7	41	Qualification for Finals series
7	Sydney FC	27	8	10	9	36	36	0	34	
8	Newcastle Jets	27	8	6	13	28	41	−13	30	
9	Wellington Phoenix (Note: Wellington Phoenix cannot qualify for the AFC Champions League as they are not recognised as an AFC club.)	27	7	4	16	34	54	−20	25	
10	Central Coast Mariners	27	3	4	20	33	70	−37	13	

Source: A-Leagues
Rules for classification: 1) points; 2) goal difference; 3) number of goals scored.
(C) Champions

==== Results summary ====
Overall								Home						Away					
Pld	W	D	L	GF	GA	GD	Pts	W	D	L	GF	GA	GD	W	D	L	GF	GA	GD
27	14	6	7	44	33	+11	48	8	2	3	23	17	+6	6	4	4	21	16	+5

Last updated: 10 April 2016.
Source: ultimatealeague.com

==== Results by round ====
Round	1	2	3	4	5	6	7	8	9	10	11	12	13	14	15	16	17	18	19	20	21	22	23	24	25	26	27
Ground	H	A	A	H	A	A	H	A	H	H	A	H	H	A	H	A	H	A	H	A	H	A	A	H	A	H	A
Result	L	D	L	W	W	W	W	W	W	W	D	W	D	L	L	W	W	D	L	D	W	L	W	D	L	W	W
Position	10	9	10	7	6	4	3	2	1	1	1	1	2	2	2	1	1	1	2	1	1	2	2	1	4	3	2

Updated to match(es) played on 10 April 2016. Source: ultimatealeague.com
A = Away; H = Home; W = Win; D = Draw; L = Loss

==== Matches ====
8 October 2015 1	Western Sydney Wanderers	1–3	Brisbane Roar	Parramatta
20:00 AEDT	Nichols 13'	Report	Maclaren 9', 34'; Bowles 23'	Stadium: Pirtek Stadium; Attendance: 14,122; Referee: Jarred Gillett

16 October 2015 2	Adelaide United	1–1	Western Sydney Wanderers	Adelaide
19:10 ACDT	Andreu 21' (o.g.)	Report	Andreu 83'	Stadium: Coopers Stadium; Attendance: 9,442; Referee: Chris Beath

24 October 2015 3	Sydney FC	1–0	Western Sydney Wanderers	Sydney
19:30 AEDT	Ninković 88'	Report		Stadium: Allianz Stadium; Attendance: 40,539; Referee: Ben Williams

1 November 2015 4	Western Sydney Wanderers	1–0	Perth Glory	Parramatta
17:30 AEDT	Vidošić 45'	Report		Stadium: Pirtek Stadium; Attendance: 14,194; Referee: Matthew Conger

7 November 2015 5	Newcastle Jets	1–2	Western Sydney Wanderers	Newcastle
17:15 AEDT	Alivodić 73'	Report	Andreu 79' (pen.); Nichols 86'	Stadium: Hunter Stadium; Attendance: 14,886; Referee: Stephen Lucas

13 November 2015 6	Melbourne City	0–3	Western Sydney Wanderers	Melbourne
19:40 AEDT		Report	Nichols 47'; Piovaccari 61'; Bridge 84'	Stadium: AAMI Park; Attendance: 7,910; Referee: Peter Green

21 November 2015 7	Western Sydney Wanderers	2–1	Wellington Phoenix	Parramatta
17:15 AEDT	Piovaccari 9'; Bridge 85'	Report	Muscat 18'	Stadium: Pirtek Stadium; Attendance: 14,426; Referee: Strebre Delovski

29 November 2015 8	Central Coast Mariners	0–2	Western Sydney Wanderers	Gosford
17:00 AEDT		Report	Šantalab 66'; Nichols 90+2'	Stadium: Central Coast Stadium; Attendance: 10,519; Referee: Alan Milliner

5 December 2015 9	Western Sydney Wanderers	2–1	Brisbane Roar	Parramatta
19:30 AEDT	Bridge 29'; Nichols 79'	Report	Maclaren 36'	Stadium: Pirtek Stadium; Attendance: 9,860; Referee: Kris Griffiths-Jones

12 December 2015 10	Western Sydney Wanderers	2–0	Melbourne Victory	Parramatta
19:30 AEDT	Bridge 54'; Castelen 79'	Report		Stadium: Pirtek Stadium; Attendance: 17,073; Referee: Shaun Evans

19 December 2015 11	Perth Glory	2–2	Western Sydney Wanderers	Perth
18:40 AWST	Castro 2' (pen.); Oxborrow 60'	Report	Šantalab 20'; Nichols 81'	Stadium: nib Stadium; Attendance: 7,409; Referee: Jarred Gillett

24 December 2015 12	Western Sydney Wanderers	2–0	Newcastle Jets	Parramatta
19:00 AEDT	Alberto 45+1'; Bridge 70'	Report		Stadium: Pirtek Stadium; Attendance: 10,141; Referee: Stephen Lucas

1 January 2016 13	Western Sydney Wanderers	0–0	Adelaide United	Parramatta
19:40 AEDT		Report		Stadium: Pirtek Stadium; Attendance: 16,312; Referee: Ben Williams

9 January 2016 14	Melbourne City	3–2	Western Sydney Wanderers	Melbourne
19:30 AEDT	Novillo 7', 85'; Fornaroli 24'	Report	Nichols 29'; Hughes 60' (o.g.)	Stadium: AAMI Park; Attendance: 9,776; Referee: Jarred Gillett

16 January 2016 15	Western Sydney Wanderers	1–2	Sydney FC	Parramatta
19:30 AEDT	Vidošić 58'	Report	Faty 22'; Smeltz 90'	Stadium: Pirtek Stadium; Attendance: 19,627; Referee: Strebre Delovski

23 January 2016 16	Central Coast Mariners	1–2	Western Sydney Wanderers	Gosford
19:30 AEDT	F. Ferreira 67'; Montgomery (red card) 79'	Report	Bridge 11'; Šantalab 87'	Stadium: Central Coast Stadium; Attendance: 13,105; Referee: Ben Williams

29 January 2016 17	Western Sydney Wanderers	4–3	Melbourne City	Parramatta
19:40 AEDT	Nichols 32'; Bridge 60', 66'; Šantalab 89'	Report	Novillo 76'; Fornaroli 78'; Cáceres (yellow card) 65' (yellow-red card) 85'; Paartalu 90+3'	Stadium: Pirtek Stadium; Attendance: 14,820; Referee: Shaun Evans

6 February 2016 18	Melbourne Victory	1–1	Western Sydney Wanderers	Melbourne
19:30 AEDT	Berisha 16'	Report	Šantalab 89'; Alberto (red card) 90+3'	Stadium: Etihad Stadium; Attendance: 25,445; Referee: Ben Williams

14 February 2016 19	Western Sydney Wanderers	2–5	Wellington Phoenix	Parramatta
17:00 AEDT	Nichols 75'; Bridge 84'; Aspropotamitis (red card) 89'	Report	Powell 4', 20', 33', 71'; McGlinchey 90' (pen.)	Stadium: Pirtek Stadium; Attendance: 12,589; Referee: Peter Green

20 February 2016 20	Sydney FC	1–1	Western Sydney Wanderers	Sydney
19:30 AEDT	Jamieson 36' (o.g.)	Report	Vidošić 13'	Stadium: Allianz Stadium; Attendance: 40,382; Referee: Jarred Gillett

26 February 2016 21	Western Sydney Wanderers	2–1	Perth Glory	Parramatta
19:40 AEDT	Castelen 62'; Šantalab 85'	Report	Keogh 64' (pen.)	Stadium: Pirtek Stadium; Attendance: 12,639; Referee: Strebre Delovski

4 March 2016 22	Brisbane Roar	3–2	Western Sydney Wanderers	Brisbane
19:00 AEST	Maclaren 5', 81'; D. Petratos 84'	Report	Andreu 74' (pen.); Castelen 78'	Stadium: Suncorp Stadium; Attendance: 13,157; Referee: Ben Williams

13 March 2016 23	Newcastle Jets	0–1	Western Sydney Wanderers	Newcastle
17:00 AEDT		Report	Sotirio 17'	Stadium: Hunter Stadium; Attendance: 12,153; Referee: Koichiro Fukushima (Japan)

19 March 2016 24	Western Sydney Wanderers	0–0	Adelaide United	Parramatta
19:30 AEDT		Report		Stadium: Pirtek Stadium; Attendance: 15,208; Referee: Takuto Okabe (Japan)

25 March 2016 25	Melbourne Victory	2–0	Western Sydney Wanderers	Melbourne
19:40 AEDT	Bozanic 3', 66'	Report		Stadium: AAMI Park; Attendance: 20,097; Referee: Strebre Delovski

1 April 2016 26	Western Sydney Wanderers	4–1	Central Coast Mariners	Parramatta
19:30 AEDT	Castelen 8'; Šantalab 36', 52'; Nichols 83'	Report	L. García 21'	Stadium: Pirtek Stadium; Attendance: 14,855; Referee: Chris Beath

10 April 2016 27	Wellington Phoenix	0–2	Western Sydney Wanderers	Wellington
17:00 NZST		Report	Šantalab 31', 44'	Stadium: Westpac Stadium; Attendance: 10,143; Referee: Shaun Evans

==== Finals series ====
24 April 2016 Semi-finals	Western Sydney Wanderers	5–4	Brisbane Roar	Parramatta
16:30 AEST	Castelen 26', 53', 59'; Šantalab 39'; Vidošić 102'	Report	D. Petratos 16' (pen.); Andreu 20' (o.g.); Maclaren 23', 81'	Stadium: Pirtek Stadium; Attendance: 20,084; Referee: Peter Green

1 May 2016 Grand Final	Adelaide United	3–1	Western Sydney Wanderers	Adelaide
15:30 ACST	Kamau 21'; Isaías 32'; Sánchez 89'	Report	Neville 58'	Stadium: Adelaide Oval; Attendance: 50,119; Referee: Jarred Gillett

=== FFA Cup ===
11 August 2015 Round of 32	Western Sydney Wanderers (New South Wales)	1–0	(Queensland) Brisbane Roar	Sydney
19:30 AEST	Mebrahtu 69'	Report		Stadium: Pepper Stadium; Attendance: 6,028; Referee: Kris Griffiths-Jones

1 September 2015 Round of 16	Palm Beach (Queensland)	0–2	(New South Wales) Western Sydney Wanderers	Gold Coast
19:30 AEST		Report	Dimas 45'; Hamill 86'	Stadium: Cbus Super Stadium; Attendance: 1,794; Referee: Alan Milliner

29 September 2015 Quarter-finals	Perth Glory (Western Australia)	1–1 (a.e.t.) (4–2 p)	(New South Wales) Western Sydney Wanderers	Perth
18:30 AWST	Marinković 60'	Report	Dimas 42'	Stadium: Dorrien Gardens; Attendance: 3,003; Referee: Stephen Lucas
	Penalties
	Marinković (penalty scored); Golec (penalty scored); Sidnei (penalty scored); R. Garcia (penalty scored)		(penalty scored) Vidošić; (penalty missed) Piovaccarli; (penalty scored) Andreu; (penalty missed) Jamieson
