= 2014–15 Western Sydney Wanderers FC season =

Western Sydney Wanderers
2014–15 season
- Chairman: Paul Lederer
- Head Coach: Tony Popovic
- Stadium: Pirtek Stadium
- A-League: 9th
- FFA Cup: Round of 32
- AFC Champions League: Group stage
- FIFA Club World Cup: 6th
- Top goalscorer: League: Kerem Bulut (5); All: Kerem Bulut, Tomi Juric (6)
- Highest home attendance: 19,484 vs Sydney FC; 28 February 2015
- Lowest home attendance: 7,239 vs Melbourne City; 11 March 2015
Home colours	Away colours

The 2014–15 Western Sydney Wanderers FC season was the club's third season since its establishment in 2012. The club participated in the A-League for the third time, the FFA Cup for the first time, the AFC Champions League for the second time and the FIFA Club World Cup for the first time.

The Wanderers' competitive season began with the 2014 FFA Cup during August 2014. Their 2014–15 A-League season commenced in October 2014, and the 2015 AFC Champions League in February 2015.

In addition, the Wanderers continued their 2014 AFC Champions League campaign from the previous season on 20 August 2014, due to the calendar format of the continental tournament not matching directly with the A-League schedule. The Wanderers won the final, which took place on 1 November 2014, with several A-League games rescheduled as a result.

== Season overview ==
On 14 May 2014, Youssouf Hersi and Shinji Ono departed from Western Sydney Wanderers after signing with Perth Glory and second division Japanese side Consadole Sapporo respectively. On 17 May, Matthew Špiranović extended his contract with the club for a further two seasons, until 2016. On 21 May, nine players concluded their contracts with the club; Adam D'Apuzzo, Michael Beauchamp, Jérome Polenz, Aaron Mooy, Tahj Minniecon, Josh Barresi, Jerrad Tyson and Dean Heffernan. On 21 May, Jason Trifiro extended his contract with the club for a further seasons, until 2015, additionally Daniel Alessi and Alusine Fofanah each signed two year senior contracts, until 2016, from the club's youth squad. On 26 May, Antony Golec extended his contract with the club for a further seasons, until 2015. On 27 May, Dean Bouzanis joined Wanderers from Carlisle United on two season contract, until 2016. On 12 June, Nikolai Topor-Stanley re-signed on a three-year deal, to keep him at the club until 2017. On 20 June 2014, the club signed Brazilian midfielder Vítor Saba from Italian side Brescia on a two-year contract. On 26 June Wanderers signed defender Brendan Hamill on a one-year contract from South Korean club Seongnam. On 19 July 2014, Wanderers signed Romeo Castelen on a two-year contract.

On 26 January 2015, Saba left Western Sydney Wanderers, with the player's contract terminated by mutual consent .

== Players ==
=== Squad information ===
N	Pos.	Nat.	Name	Age	Since	App	Goals	Ends	Transfer fee	Notes
1	GK	(Australia)	Ante Covic	51	2012	63	0	2015	Free	
2	DF	(Australia)	Shannon Cole	42	2012	42	4	2016	Free	
3	DF	(Japan)	Yūsuke Tanaka	40	2015	2	0	2015	Free	Visa player
4	DF	(Australia)	Nikolai Topor-Stanley (captain)	41	2012	60	4	2017	Free	
5	DF	(Australia)	Brendan Hamill	34	2014	0	0	2015	Free	
6	DF	(Australia)	Antony Golec	36	2014	7	0	2015	Free	
7	FW	(Australia)	Labinot Haliti	41	2012	51	9	2016	Free	
8	MF	(Croatia)	Mateo Poljak	37	2012	47	2	2016	Free	Visa player
9	FW	(Australia)	Tomi Juric	35	2013	25	9	2015	Free	
10	MF	(Japan)	Yojiro Takahagi	40	2015	6	1	2015	Free	Visa player
11	FW	(Australia)	Brendon Šantalab	44	2013	30	8	2016	Free	
12	FW	(Australia)	Nikita Rukavytsya	39	2014	0	0	2015	Free	
13	DF	(Australia)	Matthew Spiranovic (2nd vice-captain)	38	2013	23	1	2016	Free	Domestic marquee
14	FW	(Australia)	Kerem Bulut	34	2015	5	5	2015	Free	Injury replacement
15	MF	(Australia)	Yianni Perkatis	32	2013	2	0	2015	Youth system	
16	FW	(Australia)	Jaushua Sotirio	31	2014	1	0	2015	Youth system	
17	FW	(Netherlands)	Romeo Castelen	43	2014	0	0	2016	Free	Visa player
18	MF	(Italy)	Iacopo La Rocca	42	2012	47	5	2015	Free	Visa player
19	FW	(Australia)	Mark Bridge (vice-captain)	41	2012	56	18	2017	Free	
20	GK	(Australia)	Dean Bouzanis	36	2014	0	0	2016	Free	
21	MF	(Australia)	Martin Lo	30	2014	0	0	2016	Youth system	
22	MF	(Australia)	Nick Ward	41	2015	1	0	2015	Free	Injury replacement
23	MF	(Australia)	Jason Trifiro	38	2012	29	0	2015	Free	
25	DF	(Australia)	Sam Gallaway	34	2015	3	0	2015	Free	
31	MF	(Australia)	Alusine Fofanah	28	2014	1	0	2016	Youth system	
32	DF	(Australia)	Daniel Alessi	29	2014	3	0	2016	Youth system	
33	MF	(Australia)	Nick Kalmar	39	2015	8	2	2015	Free	Injury replacement
34	FW	(Australia)	Golgol Mebrahtu	36	2014	1	0	2016	Free	
35	MF	(Australia)	Kearyn Baccus	35	2014	0	0	2017	Free	Injury replacement
42	DF	(Australia)	Adrian Madaschi	44	2015	0	0	2015	Free	Injury replacement

- Last updated: 16 April 2015
- Source: westsydneyfootball.com

=== From youth squad ===
N	Pos.	Nat.	Name	Age	Notes
30	GK	(Australia)	Thomas Manos	30	
36	MF	(Australia)	Michael Trajkovski	29	
36	MF	(Australia)	Liam Youlley	29	
37	DF	(Australia)	Jonathan Aspropotamitis	30	
38	FW	(Australia)	Steve Kuzmanovski	29	
39	DF	(Australia)	Shayne D'Cunha	30	
40	GK	(Australia)	Thomas Heward-Belle	29	

=== Transfers in ===
No.	Pos.	Nat.	Name	Age	Moving from	Type	Transfer window	Ends	Transfer fee	Source
20	GK	(Australia)	Dean Bouzanis	23	(England) Carlisle United	Transfer	Pre-season	2016	Free	wswanderersfc.com.au
10	MF	(Brazil)	Vítor Saba	23	(Italy) Brescia	Transfer	Pre-season	2016	Free	wswanderersfc.com.au
5	DF	(Australia)	Brendan Hamill	21	(South Korea) Seongnam FC	Transfer	Pre-season	2015	Free	wswanderersfc.com.au
17	FW	(Netherlands)	Romeo Castelen	31	(Netherlands) RKC Waalwijk	Transfer	Pre-season	2016	Free	wswanderersfc.com.au
22	DF	(Nigeria)	Seyi Adeleke	22	(Italy) Lazio	Transfer	Pre-season	2015	Free	wswanderersfc.com.au
12	FW	(Australia)	Nikita Rukavytsya	27	(Germany) Mainz 05	Transfer	Pre-season	2015	Free	wswanderersfc.com.au
35	MF	(Australia)	Kearyn Baccus	23	(Australia) Blacktown City	Injury Replacement	Mid-season	2015	Free	wswanderersfc.com.au
33	MF	(Australia)	Nick Kalmar	27	Melbourne City	Injury Replacement	Mid-season	2015	Free	wswanderersfc.com.au
3	DF	(Japan)	Yūsuke Tanaka	28	(Japan) Kawasaki Frontale	Injury Replacement	Mid-season	2015	Free	wswanderersfc.com.au
25	DF	(Australia)	Sam Gallaway	22	Newcastle Jets	Transfer	Mid-season	2015	Free	wswanderersfc.com.au
14	FW	(Australia)	Kerem Bulut	22		Injury Replacement	Mid-season	2015	Free	wswanderersfc.com.au
10	MF	(Japan)	Yojiro Takahagi	28	(Japan) Sanfrecce Hiroshima	Transfer	Mid-season	2015	Free	wswanderersfc.com.au
42	DF	(Australia)	Adrian Madaschi	32	Newcastle Jets	Injury Replacement	Mid-season	2015	Free	a-league.com.au
22	MF	(Australia)	Nick Ward	29		Injury Replacement	Mid-season	2015	Free	au.sports.yahoo.com

=== Transfers out ===
No.	Pos.	Nat.	Name	Age	Moving to	Type	Transfer window	Transfer fee	Source
3	DF	(Australia)	Adam D'Apuzzo	27		Retired	Pre-season		wswanderersfc.com.au
5	DF	(Australia)	Michael Beauchamp	33	(Thailand) PTT Rayong	End of contract	Pre-season	Free	wswanderersfc.com.au
6	MF	(Germany)	Jérome Polenz	27	(Norway) Sarpsborg 08	End of contract	Pre-season	Free	wswanderersfc.com.au
10	MF	(Australia)	Aaron Mooy	23	Melbourne City	Transfer	Pre-season	Free	wswanderersfc.com.au
12	FW	(Australia)	Tahj Minniecon	25	(Australia) Rockdale City Suns	End of contract	Pre-season	Free	wswanderersfc.com.au
16	MF	(Australia)	Josh Barresi	19	Newcastle Jets	End of contract	Pre-season	Free	wswanderersfc.com.au
17	FW	(Netherlands)	Youssouf Hersi	31	Perth Glory	Transfer	Pre-season	Free	wswanderersfc.com.au
20	GK	(Australia)	Jerrad Tyson	24	(Hong Kong) Sun Pegasus	End of contract	Pre-season	Free	wswanderersfc.com.au
21	MF	(Japan)	Shinji Ono	34	(Japan) Consadole Sapporo	End of contract	Pre-season	Free	wswanderersfc.com.au
22	DF	(Australia)	Dean Heffernan	34		Retired	Pre-season		wswanderersfc.com.au
10	MF	(Brazil)	Vítor Saba	24		Released	Mid-season		wswanderersfc.com.au
3	DF	(Australia)	Daniel Mullen	25	Newcastle Jets	Released	Mid-season	Free	wswanderersfc.com.au
14	FW	(Australia)	Kwabena Appiah	22		Released	Mid-season		a-league.com.au
22	DF	(Nigeria)	Seyi Adeleke	23		Released	Mid-season		wswanderersfc.com.au

== Technical staff ==
Position	Name
Head coach	(Australia) Tony Popovic
Assistant coach	(England) Ian Crook
Goalkeeping coach	(Australia) Ron Corry
Strength & Conditioning Coach	(Australia) Adam Waterson
Physiotherapist	(Australia) David Hughes

== Statistics ==
=== Squad statistics ===
N	Pos.	Nat.	Name	Total					A-League					FFA Cup					AFC Champions League					FIFA Club World Cup
N	Pos.	Nat.	Name	Apps	Goals	Yellow card	Second yellow card	Red card	Apps	Goals	Yellow card	Second yellow card	Red card	Apps	Goals	Yellow card	Second yellow card	Red card	Apps	Goals	Yellow card	Second yellow card	Red card	Apps	Goals	Yellow card	Second yellow card	Red card
1	GK	(Australia)	Ante Covic	28	0	2	0	0	21	0	2	0	0	1	0	0	0	0	5	0	0	0	0	1	0	0	0	0
2	DF	(Australia)	Shannon Cole	16	0	3	0	0	7+5	0	3	0	0	0	0	0	0	0	1+2	0	0	0	0	0+1	0	0	0	0
3	DF	(Japan)	Yūsuke Tanaka	15	0	6	0	0	10	0	4	0	0	0	0	0	0	0	5	0	2	0	0	0	0	0	0	0
4	DF	(Australia)	Nikolai Topor-Stanley	28	0	7	1	0	20	0	5	1	0	1	0	1	0	0	6	0	0	0	0	1	0	1	0	0
5	DF	(Australia)	Brendan Hamill	17	0	1	0	0	13+2	0	0	0	0	0	0	0	0	0	1	0	0	0	0	1	0	1	0	0
6	DF	(Australia)	Antony Golec	24	0	9	0	0	16+1	0	6	0	0	1	0	0	0	0	4	0	2	0	0	1+1	0	1	0	0
7	FW	(Australia)	Labinot Haliti	28	1	0	0	0	12+8	1	0	0	0	0+1	0	0	0	0	3+2	0	0	0	0	2	0	0	0	0
8	MF	(Croatia)	Mateo Poljak	22	1	7	0	0	19	1	6	0	0	1	0	0	0	0	0	0	0	0	0	2	0	1	0	0
9	FW	(Australia)	Tomi Juric	22	6	2	0	0	11+3	4	1	0	0	1	0	0	0	0	3+2	1	1	0	0	0+2	1	0	0	0
10	MF	(Japan)	Yojiro Takahagi	17	3	0	0	0	9+2	2	0	0	0	0	0	0	0	0	6	1	0	0	0	0	0	0	0	0
11	FW	(Australia)	Brendon Šantalab	6	2	1	0	0	4+2	2	1	0	0	0	0	0	0	0	0	0	0	0	0	0	0	0	0	0
12	FW	(Australia)	Nikita Rukavytsya	28	4	2	0	0	18+5	3	1	0	0	0	0	0	0	0	4	1	1	0	0	1	0	0	0	0
13	DF	(Australia)	Matthew Spiranovic	19	0	3	1	0	13	0	2	1	0	0	0	0	0	0	5	0	0	0	0	1	0	1	0	0
14	FW	(Australia)	Kerem Bulut	13	6	5	0	0	7+2	5	3	0	0	0	0	0	0	0	3+1	1	2	0	0	0	0	0	0	0
15	MF	(Australia)	Yianni Perkatis	7	0	0	0	0	5+1	0	0	0	0	1	0	0	0	0	0	0	0	0	0	0	0	0	0	0
16	FW	(Australia)	Jaushua Sotirio	14	1	1	0	0	5+6	1	0	0	0	1	0	1	0	0	0+1	0	0	0	0	1	0	0	0	0
17	FW	(Netherlands)	Romeo Castelen	23	4	0	0	0	14+2	2	0	0	0	0	0	0	0	0	4+1	1	0	0	0	2	1	0	0	0
18	MF	(Italy)	Iacopo La Rocca	25	3	4	0	0	17+1	1	2	0	0	1	0	0	0	0	5	1	1	0	0	1	1	1	0	0
19	FW	(Australia)	Mark Bridge	24	5	2	0	0	14+4	3	2	0	0	0+1	0	0	0	0	4	2	0	0	0	1	0	0	0	0
20	GK	(Australia)	Dean Bouzanis	8	0	0	0	0	6	0	0	0	0	0	0	0	0	0	1	0	0	0	0	1	0	0	0	0
22	MF	(Australia)	Nick Ward	1	0	0	0	0	0+1	0	0	0	0	0	0	0	0	0	0	0	0	0	0	0	0	0	0	0
23	MF	(Australia)	Jason Trifiro	20	0	1	0	0	4+11	0	1	0	0	1	0	0	0	0	0+3	0	0	0	0	1	0	0	0	0
25	DF	(Australia)	Sam Gallaway	14	0	2	0	0	8+3	0	2	0	0	0	0	0	0	0	2+1	0	0	0	0	0	0	0	0	0
30	GK	(Australia)	Thomas Manos	0	0	0	0	0	0	0	0	0	0	0	0	0	0	0	0	0	0	0	0	0	0	0	0	0
31	MF	(Australia)	Alusine Fofanah	6	0	1	0	0	4	0	1	0	0	0+1	0	0	0	0	0	0	0	0	0	0+1	0	0	0	0
32	DF	(Australia)	Daniel Alessi	5	0	0	0	0	4	0	0	0	0	0	0	0	0	0	0	0	0	0	0	1	0	0	0	0
33	MF	(Australia)	Nick Kalmar	13	2	0	0	0	8+2	2	0	0	0	0	0	0	0	0	2+1	0	0	0	0	0	0	0	0	0
34	FW	(Australia)	Golgol Mebrahtu	1	0	0	0	0	0+1	0	0	0	0	0	0	0	0	0	0	0	0	0	0	0	0	0	0	0
35	MF	(Australia)	Kearyn Baccus	7	0	3	0	0	2+2	0	0	0	0	0	0	0	0	0	1+1	0	2	0	0	1	0	1	0	0
36	MF	(Australia)	Michael Trajkovski	1	0	0	0	0	0+1	0	0	0	0	0	0	0	0	0	0	0	0	0	0	0	0	0	0	0
36	MF	(Australia)	Liam Youlley	1	1	1	0	0	1	1	1	0	0	0	0	0	0	0	0	0	0	0	0	0	0	0	0	0
37	DF	(Australia)	Jonathan Aspropotamitis	9	0	3	0	0	8	0	3	0	0	0	0	0	0	0	1	0	0	0	0	0	0	0	0	0
38	FW	(Australia)	Steve Kuzmanovski	8	0	0	0	0	3+5	0	0	0	0	0	0	0	0	0	0	0	0	0	0	0	0	0	0	0
39	DF	(Australia)	Shayne D'Cunha	2	0	0	0	0	1+1	0	0	0	0	0	0	0	0	0	0	0	0	0	0	0	0	0	0	0
40	GK	(Australia)	Thomas Heward-Belle	0	0	0	0	0	0	0	0	0	0	0	0	0	0	0	0	0	0	0	0	0	0	0	0	0
42	DF	(Australia)	Adrian Madaschi	0	0	0	0	0	0	0	0	0	0	0	0	0	0	0	0	0	0	0	0	0	0	0	0	0
Players no longer at the club:
3	DF	(Australia)	Daniel Mullen	6	0	3	0	0	4	0	1	0	0	1	0	1	0	0	0	0	0	0	0	1	0	1	0	0
10	MF	(Brazil)	Vítor Saba	9	1	0	0	1	4+4	0	0	0	1	0	0	0	0	0	0	0	0	0	0	0+1	1	0	0	0
14	FW	(Australia)	Kwabena Appiah	3	0	0	0	0	1+1	0	0	0	0	1	0	0	0	0	0	0	0	0	0	0	0	0	0	0
22	DF	(Nigeria)	Seyi Adeleke	6	0	2	0	0	4	0	2	0	0	0	0	0	0	0	0	0	0	0	0	2	0	0	0	0

- Last updated: 5 May 2015
- Source: au.soccerway.com
- (yellow card) = Number of bookings; (second yellow card) = Number of sending offs after a second yellow card; (red card) = Number of sending offs by a direct red card.

== Pre-season and friendlies ==
23 July 2014 Friendly	Macarthur Rams (Australia)	0–1	(Australia) Western Sydney Wanderers	Sydney, Australia
19:30		Report; Summary	Šantalab 75'	Stadium: Campbelltown Stadium; Attendance: 5,000

30 July 2014 Friendly	Canberra FC (Australia)	0–1	(Australia) Western Sydney Wanderers	Canberra, Australia
19:00		Report; Summary	Sotirio 22'	Stadium: Deakin Stadium; Attendance: 1,500

5 August 2014 Friendly	APIA Leichhardt Tigers (Australia)	0–1	(Australia) Western Sydney Wanderers	Sydney, Australia
19:30		Report; Summary	Topor-Stanley 3'	Stadium: Leichhardt Oval; Attendance: 4,000

4 September 2014 IPIC Championship	East Riffa (Bahrain)	2–1	(Australia) Western Sydney Wanderers	Abu Dhabi, United Arab Emirates
19:30 GST	Ayyad 12'; Konaté 61'	Report; Summary	Fofanah 50'	Stadium: Sport Division Stadium

7 September 2014 IPIC Championship	Al-Jazira (United Arab Emirates)	1–2	(Australia) Western Sydney Wanderers	Abu Dhabi, United Arab Emirates
19:30 GST	Jucilei 15'	Report; Summary	La Rocca 16'; Appiah 60'	Stadium: Sport Division Stadium

== Competitions ==
=== Overall ===
Competition	Started round	Final position / round	First match	Last match
A-League	—	9th	10 October 2014	18 April 2015
FFA Cup	Round of 32	Round of 32	12 August 2014	12 August 2014
AFC Champions League	Group stage	Group stage	25 February 2015	5 May 2015
FIFA Club World Cup	Quarter finals	6th	13 December 2014	17 December 2014

=== A-League ===
==== League table ====
Pos	Team	Pld	W	D	L	GF	GA	GD	Pts	Qualification
1	Melbourne Victory (C)	27	15	8	4	56	31	+25	53	Qualification for 2016 AFC Champions League group stage and Finals series
2	Sydney FC	27	14	8	5	52	35	+17	50	Qualification for 2016 AFC Champions League group stage and Finals series
3	Adelaide United	27	14	4	9	47	32	+15	46	Qualification for 2016 AFC Champions League qualifying play-off and Finals series
4	Wellington Phoenix (Note: Wellington Phoenix cannot qualify for the AFC Champions League as they are not recognised as an AFC club.)	27	14	4	9	45	35	+10	46	Qualification for Finals series
5	Melbourne City	27	9	8	10	36	41	−5	35	Qualification for Finals series
6	Brisbane Roar	27	10	4	13	42	43	−1	34	Qualification for Finals series
7	Perth Glory (Note: Perth Glory disqualified from the Finals series and given a compulsory 7th-place finish due to salary cap violations.)	27	14	8	5	45	35	+10	50	
8	Central Coast Mariners	27	5	8	14	26	50	−24	23	
9	Western Sydney Wanderers	27	4	6	17	29	44	−15	18	
10	Newcastle Jets	27	3	8	16	23	55	−32	17	

Source: A-League
Rules for classification: 1) points; 2) goal difference; 3) number of goals scored.
(C) Champions

==== Results summary ====
Overall								Home						Away					
Pld	W	D	L	GF	GA	GD	Pts	W	D	L	GF	GA	GD	W	D	L	GF	GA	GD
27	4	6	17	29	44	−15	18	3	5	6	16	20	−4	1	1	11	13	24	−11

Last updated: 25 April 2015.
Source: ultimatealeague.com

==== Results by round ====
Round	1	2	3	4	5	6	7	8	9	10	11	12	13	14	15	16	17	18	19	20	21	22	23	24	25	26	27
Ground	A	A	H	H	A	A	H	H	A	H	A	A	H	H	A	H	A	A	H	A	H	H	A	H	A	H	H
Result	L	L	D	L	L	L	D	D	L	W	W	L	D	L	L	W	D	L	L	L	L	L	L	D	L	W	L
Position	10	10	9	9	9	10	10	10	10	10	10	10	10	10	10	10	10	10	10	9	9	10	9	9	10	9	9

Updated to match(es) played on 25 April 2015. Source: ultimatealeague.com
A = Away; H = Home; W = Win; D = Draw; L = Loss

==== Matches ====
10 October 2014 1	Melbourne Victory	4–1	Western Sydney Wanderers	Melbourne
Friday 19:40 AEDT	Delpierre 8'; Berisha 19' (pen.); Broxham 28'; Thompson 54'	Report	Bridge 41'	Stadium: Etihad Stadium; Attendance: 30,083; Referee: Jarred Gillett

18 October 2014 2	Sydney FC	3–2	Western Sydney Wanderers	Sydney
Saturday 19:30 AEDT	Gameiro 45+1'; Ognenovski 49'; Brosque 79'	Report	Bridge 19'; Janjetović 24' (o.g.); Saba (red card) 69'	Stadium: Allianz Stadium; Attendance: 41,213; Referee: Kris Griffiths-Jones

7 November 2014 5	Wellington Phoenix	1–0	Western Sydney Wanderers	Wellington
Friday 19:40 NZDT	Burns 79'	Report		Stadium: Westpac Stadium; Attendance: 7,008; Referee: Lucien Laverdure

15 November 2014 6	Perth Glory	2–1	Western Sydney Wanderers	Perth
Saturday 18:30 AWST	Djulbic 9'; Jamieson 78'	Report	Sotirio 85'	Stadium: nib Stadium; Attendance: 12,166; Referee: Shaun Evans

19 November 2014; Rescheduled 3	Western Sydney Wanderers	0–0	Central Coast Mariners	Parramatta
Wednesday 19:30 AEDT		Report		Stadium: Pirtek Stadium; Attendance: 14,691; Referee: Kris Griffiths-Jones

22 November 2014 7	Western Sydney Wanderers	1–1	Newcastle Jets	Parramatta
Saturday 17:00 AEDT	Juric 12'	Report	Flores 27'	Stadium: Pirtek Stadium; Attendance: 14,136; Referee: Peter O'Leary

29 November 2014 8	Western Sydney Wanderers	1–1	Sydney FC	Parramatta
Saturday 19:30 AEDT	Juric 30'	Report	Ibini 34'	Stadium: Pirtek Stadium; Attendance: 19,138; Referee: Peter Green

3 December 2014; Rescheduled 4	Western Sydney Wanderers	0–1	Brisbane Roar	Parramatta
Wednesday 19:30 AEDT		Report	Henrique 5'	Stadium: Pirtek Stadium; Attendance: 10,252; Referee: Kris Griffiths-Jones

6 December 2014 9	Adelaide United	2–0	Western Sydney Wanderers	Adelaide
Saturday 19:30 ACDT	Carrusca 36'; F. Ferreira 55'	Report	Topor-Stanley (yellow card) 15' (yellow-red card) 17'	Stadium: Coopers Stadium; Attendance: 12,122; Referee: Jarred Gillett

28 December 2014 12	Wellington Phoenix	1–0	Western Sydney Wanderers	Wellington
Sunday 19:00 NZDT	Krishna 14'	Report		Stadium: Westpac Stadium; Attendance: 8,606; Referee: Peter O'Leary

1 January 2015 13	Western Sydney Wanderers	0–0	Central Coast Mariners	Parramatta
Thursday 19:30 AEDT		Report		Stadium: Pirtek Stadium; Attendance: 14,137; Referee: Strebre Delovski

6 January 2015 14	Western Sydney Wanderers	1–2	Melbourne Victory	Parramatta
Tuesday 19:30 AEDT	Kalmar 55'	Report	Valeri 26'; Finkler 80'	Stadium: Pirtek Stadium; Attendance: 14,619; Referee: Alan Milliner

1 February 2015 15	Melbourne City	2–1	Western Sydney Wanderers	Melbourne
Sunday 17:00 AEDT	Melling 25'; Mooy 73'	Report	Takahagi 4'	Stadium: AAMI Park; Attendance: 7,561; Referee: Kris Griffiths-Jones

8 February 2015 16	Western Sydney Wanderers	2–0	Wellington Phoenix	Penrith
Sunday 17:00 AEDT	Rukavytsya 18'; Šantalab 90+1'	Report		Stadium: Sportingbet Stadium; Attendance: 12,663; Referee: Stephen Lucas

14 February 2015 17	Newcastle Jets	1–1	Western Sydney Wanderers	Newcastle
17:00 AEDT	Lee 90+2'	Report	Šantalab 86' (pen.)	Stadium: Hunter Stadium; Attendance: 11,019; Referee: Lucien Laverdure

21 February 2015 18	Adelaide United	2–1	Western Sydney Wanderers	Adelaide
Saturday 19:30 ACDT	Dijte 51'; Cirio 90+2'	Report	Haliti 19'; Spiranovic (yellow card) 54' (yellow-red card) 83'	Stadium: Coopers Stadium; Attendance: 9,212; Referee: Peter O'Leary

28 February 2015 19	Western Sydney Wanderers	3–4	Sydney FC	Sydney
Saturday 19:30 AEDT	La Rocca 33'; Bulut 42', 53'	Report	Covic 10' (o.g.); Janko 18', 24'; Antonis 75'; Tavares (yellow card) 32' (yellow-red card) 82'	Stadium: Pirtek Stadium; Attendance: 19,484; Referee: Chris Beath

8 March 2015 20	Brisbane Roar	1–0	Western Sydney Wanderers	Brisbane
Sunday 16:00 AEST	Borrello 53'	Report		Stadium: Suncorp Stadium; Attendance: 12,095; Referee: Yudai Yamamoto (Japan)

11 March 2015; Rescheduled 10	Western Sydney Wanderers	3–2	Melbourne City	Parramatta
Wednesday 19:30 AEDT	Poljak 38'; Juric 79' (pen.); Rukavytsya 90+1'	Report	Safuwan 28'; Mooy 71'; Chapman (red card) 82'	Stadium: Pirtek Stadium; Attendance: 7,239; Referee: Strebre Delovski

13 March 2015 21	Western Sydney Wanderers	0–3	Melbourne Victory	Parramatta
Friday 19:40 AEDT		Report	Berisha 26', 82'; Thompson 62'	Stadium: Pirtek Stadium; Attendance: 11,073; Referee: Peter O'Leary

21 March 2015 22	Western Sydney Wanderers	1–2	Newcastle Jets	Parramatta
Saturday 17:00 AEDT	Kalmar 51'	Report	Alivodić 22'; Lee 45'	Stadium: Pirtek Stadium; Attendance: 10,109; Referee: Strebre Delovski

25 March 2015; Rescheduled 11	Brisbane Roar	1–4	Western Sydney Wanderers	Brisbane
Wednesday 19:00 AEST	Aspropotamitis 41' (o.g.)	Report	Rukavytsya 20'; Bulut 44', 89'; Castelen 58'	Stadium: Suncorp Stadium; Attendance: 6,813; Referee: Lucien Laverdure

28 March 2015 23	Perth Glory	3–2	Western Sydney Wanderers	Perth
Saturday 18:30 AEDT	Sidnei 54'; R. Griffiths 68'; Risdon 88'	Report	Castelen 13'; Bulut 72'	Stadium: nib Stadium; Attendance: 9,415; Referee: Stephen Lucas

3 April 2015 24	Western Sydney Wanderers	1–1	Melbourne City	Parramatta
Friday 19:40 AEDT	Takahagi 20'	Report	Novillo 39'	Stadium: Pirtek Stadium; Attendance: 9,054; Referee: Jarred Gillett

11 April 2015 25	Central Coast Mariners	1–0	Western Sydney Wanderers	Gosford
Saturday 19:30 AEST	J. Rose 2'	Report		Stadium: Central Coast Stadium; Attendance: 9,548; Referee: Adam Fielding

18 April 2015 26	Western Sydney Wanderers	2–1	Adelaide United	Parramatta
Saturday 17:00 AEST	Juric 63' (pen.); Bridge 73'	Report	Cirio 45'; Boogaard (red card) 62'	Stadium: Pirtek Stadium; Attendance: 9,837; Referee: Jarred Gillett

25 April 2015 27	Western Sydney Wanderers	1–2	Perth Glory	Parramatta
Saturday 17:00 AEST	Youlley 53'	Report	Maclaren 17'; Keogh 66'; Kramar (yellow card) 52' (yellow-red card) 76'	Stadium: Pirtek Stadium; Attendance: 8,852; Referee: Matthew Conger

=== FFA Cup ===
12 August 2014 Round of 32	Adelaide City	1–0	Western Sydney Wanderers	Adelaide
19:30 ACST	Love 75'	Report; Summary		Stadium: Marden Sports Complex; Attendance: 2,701; Referee: Alan Milliner

=== AFC Champions League ===
==== Group stage ====
Pos	Team	Pld	W	D	L	GF	GA	GD	Pts	Qualification	GET	SEO	WSW	KSM
1	(China) Guangzhou Evergrande	6	3	1	2	9	9	0	10	Advance to knockout stage	—	1–0	0–2	4–3
2	(South Korea) FC Seoul	6	2	3	1	5	4	+1	9	Advance to knockout stage	0–0	—	0–0	1–0
3	(Australia) Western Sydney Wanderers	6	2	2	2	9	7	+2	8		2–3	1–1	—	1–2
4	(Japan) Kashima Antlers	6	2	0	4	10	13	−3	6		2–1	2–3	1–3	—

Source: AFC
Rules for classification: Group stage tiebreakers

25 February 2015 1	Kashima Antlers (Japan)	1–3	(Australia) Western Sydney Wanderers	Kashima, Japan
19:00 UTC+9	Doi 68'	Report	Shoji 54' (o.g.); Takahagi 86'; Bridge 90+3'	Stadium: Kashima Soccer Stadium; Attendance: 7,736; Referee: Fahad Al-Mirdasi (Saudi Arabia)

4 March 2015 2	Western Sydney Wanderers (Australia)	2–3	(China) Guangzhou Evergrande	Sydney, Australia
19:30 UTC+11	La Rocca 57'; Castelen 90+5'	Report	Goulart 19', 58', 64'	Stadium: Parramatta Stadium; Attendance: 11,418; Referee: Nagor Amir Noor Mohamed (Malaysia)

18 March 2015 3	FC Seoul (South Korea)	0–0	(Australia) Western Sydney Wanderers	Seoul, South Korea
19:30 UTC+9		Report		Stadium: Seoul World Cup Stadium; Attendance: 5,645; Referee: Ammar Al-Jeneibi (United Arab Emirates)

8 April 2015 4	Western Sydney Wanderers (Australia)	1–1	(South Korea) FC Seoul	Sydney, Australia
19:30 UTC+10	Bulut 12'	Report	Go 72'	Stadium: Parramatta Stadium; Attendance: 7,073; Referee: Valentin Kovalenko (Uzbekistan)

21 April 2015 5	Western Sydney Wanderers (Australia)	1–2	(Japan) Kashima Antlers	Sydney, Australia
19:30 UTC+10	Rukavytsya 24'	Report	Doi 66'; Kanazaki 90+1'	Stadium: Parramatta Stadium; Attendance: 5,221; Referee: Khamis Al-Marri (Qatar)

5 May 2015 6	Guangzhou Evergrande (China)	0–2	(Australia) Western Sydney Wanderers	Guangzhou, China
19:00 UTC+8		Report	Bridge 33'; Juric 90+1'	Stadium: Tianhe Stadium; Attendance: 35,641; Referee: Nawaf Shukralla (Bahrain)

=== FIFA Club World Cup ===
13 December 2014 Quarter-finals	Cruz Azul (Mexico)	3–1 (a.e.t.)	(Australia) Western Sydney Wanderers	Rabat, Morocco
19:30	Torrado 89' (pen.), 118' (pen.); Pavone 108'	Report	La Rocca 65'; Spiranovic (yellow card) 31' (yellow-red card) 74'; Topor-Stanley (yellow card) 53' (yellow-red card) 102'	Stadium: Prince Moulay Abdellah Stadium; Attendance: 22,153; Referee: Noumandiez Doué (Ivory Coast)

17 December 2014 Fifth place play-off	ES Sétif (Algeria)	2–2 (5–4 p)	(Australia) Western Sydney Wanderers	Marrakesh, Morocco
16:30	Mullen 50' (o.g.); Ziaya 57'	Report	Castelen 5'; Saba 89'	Stadium: Stade de Marrakech; Attendance: 18,458; Referee: Norbert Hauata (Tahiti)
	Penalties
	Djahnit (penalty missed); Gasmi (penalty scored); Belameiri (penalty scored); Ziaya (penalty missed); Mellouli (penalty scored); Arroussi (penalty missed); Megateli (penalty scored); Zerara (penalty scored)		(penalty scored) Saba; (penalty missed) Haliti; (penalty scored) J. Trifiro; (penalty scored) Juric; (penalty missed) D. Bouzanis; (penalty missed) Mullen; (penalty scored) Fofanah; (penalty missed) Adeleke
