= 2013–14 Western Sydney Wanderers FC season =

Western Sydney Wanderers
2013–14 season
- Chairman: Lyall Gorman
- Manager: Tony Popovic
- Stadium: Pirtek Stadium
- A-League: 2nd
- A-League Finals Series: Runners-up
- AFC Champions League: Champions
- Top goalscorer: League: Tomi Juric (8); All: Tomi Juric (12)
- Highest home attendance: 18,080 vs Sydney FC (11 January 2014)
- Lowest home attendance: 11,892 vs Adelaide United (15 March 2014)
Home colours	Away colours

The 2013–14 Western Sydney Wanderers FC season was the club's second season since its establishment in 2012. The club participated in the A-League for the second time, as well as the AFC Champions League for the first time.

== Season overview ==
On 30 April, Western Sydney Wanderers announced the release of four players, Dino Kresinger, Tarek Elrich, Joey Gibbs and Rocky Visconte. Labinot Haliti and Jason Trifiro signed one year extensions to their initial one-year contract on 1 May, as did Tahj Minniecon on 9 May. On 20 May, forward Tomi Juric signed a two-year deal with the club. On 1 July, defender Dean Heffernan signed a one-year deal with the club. On 31 July, Western Sydney Wanderers agreed on the transfer of midfielder Reece Caira to Wellington Phoenix FC. On 6 August, forward Brendon Šantalab signed a one-year deal with the club. On 1 September, Mark Bridge extended his contract with Western Sydney Wanderers for a further three years, until 2017. On 5 September, Mateo Poljak signed 2-year extension with the club, until 2016. On 1 October, Matthew Špiranović signed a one-year deal with the club.

On 12 October, Western Sydney Wanderers played their first match of the A-League season drawing against Central Coast Mariners 1–1 with new signing Juric scoring the equalising goal on the 87th minute. On 20 October, Wanderers drew their first home game 1–1 against Wellington Phoenix with a goal from Polenz. On 26 October, Wanderers defeated Sydney 0–2 at a sold-out Sydney Football Stadium, winning the first Sydney Derby match of the season with goals from La Rocca and Ono. On 1 November, Wanderers defeated Adelaide United 2–1 with Juric scoring both goals to win the match. On 8 November, Wanderers continued their unbeaten run of the season with a 0–1 win against Melbourne Heart, Cole provided the only goal of the match. On 13 November, following an impressive start to the season, forward Brendon Šantalab extended his initial one-year contract with the club for another two-years, until 2016. On 16 November, Wanderers defeated Melbourne Victory 1–0 with a goal from Bridge. On 22 November, Wanderers lost their first game of the season 3–1 against Brisbane Roar with Šantalab scored the only goal for the Wanderers. On 1 December, Wanderers drew 0–0 Wellington Phoenix. On 7 December, Wanderers drew 1–1 at home against Melbourne Heart with Mooy leveling the score on the 44th minute. On 9 December, forward Labinot Haliti signed a two-season contract extension until 2016. For the 2014 AFC Champions League Wanderers were drawn in Group H on 10 December, alongside Guizhou Renhe of China, Ulsan Hyundai of South Korea and Kawasaki Frontale of Japan. On 14 December, Wanderers continued the winnings ways with a 0–1 away win, courtesy of Bridge, against Newcastle Jets. On 22 December, Ante Čović and Shannon Cole re-signed with the club for a further one and two years respectively. Wanderers picked up their sixth win of the season after a 2–0 win against Central Coast Mariners at Pirtek Stadium on 23 December. On 28 December, Wanderers drew 1–1 with Melbourne Victory. Substitute Šantalab appeared to have given Wanderers the three points with a goal only minutes after coming on until a 94th-minute goal from Melbourne Victory.

On 1 January 2014, Wanderers lost their first match of the new year against Wellington Phoenix with a 1–3 score. A 62nd-minute goal from Bridge was not enough to secure the home win for Wanderers with Wellington Phoenix scoring three goals late into the game. On 11 January, Wanderers won the second Sydney Derby 1–0 in front of the biggest crowd of the season at Pirtek Stadium after a goal from substitute Šantalab on the 86th minute of the match. On 14 January, Wanderers lost 3–1 to Melbourne Victory in a rescheduled match due to Melbourne Victory's involvement in the 2014 AFC Champions League. Juric scored the only goal for an under-strength Wanderers. Wanderers remained in second position in the league despite a 1–0 away loss to Adelaide United, after a controversial fourth-minute goal on 19 January. On 26 January, Wanderers defeated Perth Glory 3–1 in their first clash of the season. Goals from Šantalab and Mooy put Wanderers ahead in the first half, and a penalty kick scored by Bridge on the 71st minute ensured the win. On 31 January, Wanderers drew with Newcastle Jest 2–2; a set-piece goal from Mooy before half-time leveled the score and a goal from captain Michael Beauchamp just after the hour mark looked to have claimed a win before a last minute goal meant the points were shared. On 3 February, Golgol Mebrahtu and Daniel Mullen were signed to the club until the end of the 2015–16 season. Forward Mebrahtu was transferred from Melbourne Heart and defender signed from Chinese Super League club Dalian Aerbin. On 5 February, Antony Golec was signed to the club until the end of the season from Adelaide United. Since there were no positions remaining in Wanderers' A-League squad, Golec, along with Mebrahtu and Mullen were only eligible to participate in the club's AFC Champions League campaign until the end of the season. On 7 February, Wanderers secured a 1–1 draw at home against first placed Brisbane Roar. A late 85th-minute goal from Haliti clinched the crucial point. On 26 February, Wanderers Asian debut ended in defeat, with the team losing 1–3 at home to Ulsan Hyundai. A first-minute goal by Šantalab was cancelled out by sloppy defending as Ulsan Hyundai scored three unanswered goals to take the match. On 5 March, following a season-ending injured incurred by Tahj Minniecon, Golgol Mebrahtu was added to the Wanderers squad as an injury replacement. On 8 March, Wanderers played their third derby match of the season in front of a sold-out crowd of 40,285 fans at Allianz Stadium. After a dominating first half performance against their fierce rivals, Wanderers took the lead via a Shinji Ono goal early in the second half before falling 3–1 to Sydney FC. On 12 March, Wanderers earned their first ever win in the AFC Champions League with a 1–0 away win against Guizhou Renhe at the Guiyang Olympic Sports Center. The 10th-minute goal came after Bridge reacted quickly to poke the ball into the back of the net from close, after an initial save from Guizhou’s keeper. On 15 March, Wanderers dropped to third on the A-League table after a 0–0 draw against Adelaide United at home. On 18 March, Daniel Mullen was added to the Wanderers A-League squad as injury replacement for Golgol Mebrahtu. On 19 March, Wanderers secured a 1–0 win over Kawasaki Frontale in the AFC Champions League, with a third-minute goal from Haliti. On 23 March, Wanderers defeated Perth Glory 3–0, with Polenz, Bridge and Juric all finding the back of the net during the win. On 29 March, Wanderers lost 2–1 to Central Coast Mariners. Topor-Stanley's equalising goal looked to have secured Wanderers a point until the contest was decided on the 90th minute. On 1 April, Wanderers fell short away from home 2–1 against Kawasaki Frontale in their fourth AFC Champions League match, with Haliti scoring Wanderers only goal. On 5 April, Wanderers and Brisbane Roar shared the points in a 1–1 draw, with Juric finding the back of the net. On 12 April, Wanderers secured second place with a 2–3 away win to Melbourne Heart in their final match of the A-League regular season. Topor-Stanley, Šantalab and Hersi all shared in the spoils.

== Players ==
=== Squad information ===
N	Pos.	Nat.	Name	Age	Since	App	Goals	Ends	Transfer fee	Notes
1	GK	(Australia)	Ante Čović	51	2012	63	0	2015	Free	
2	DF	(Australia)	Shannon Cole	42	2012	42	4	2016	Free	
3	DF	(Australia)	Adam D'Apuzzo	40	2012	49	0	2014	Free	
4	DF	(Australia)	Nikolai Topor-Stanley (vice-captain)	41	2012	60	4	2014	Free	
5	DF	(Australia)	Michael Beauchamp (captain)	45	2012	44	2	2014	Free	
6	MF	(Germany)	Jérome Polenz	39	2012	50	2	2014	Free	
7	FW	(Australia)	Labinot Haliti	41	2012	51	9	2016	Free	
8	MF	(Croatia)	Mateo Poljak	37	2012	47	2	2016	Free	
9	FW	(Australia)	Tomi Juric	35	2013	25	9	2015	Free	
10	MF	(Australia)	Aaron Mooy	36	2012	54	5	2014	Free	
11	FW	(Australia)	Brendon Šantalab	44	2013	30	8	2016	Free	
12	FW	(Australia)	Tahj Minniecon	37	2012	17	0	2014	Free	
13	DF	(Australia)	Matthew Špiranović	38	2013	23	1	2014	Free	
14	FW	(New Zealand)	Kwabena Appiah	34	2012	30	0	2015	Free	
15	MF	(Australia)	Yianni Perkatis	32	2013	2	0	2015	Youth system	
16	MF	(Australia)	Josh Barresi	32	2013	0	0	2015	Free	
17	MF	(Netherlands)	Youssouf Hersi	44	2012	53	8	2014	Free	
18	DF	(Italy)	Iacopo La Rocca	42	2012	47	5	2015	Free	
19	FW	(Australia)	Mark Bridge	41	2012	56	18	2017	Free	
20	GK	(Australia)	Jerrad Tyson	37	2012	3	0	2014	Free	
21	MF	(Japan)	Shinji Ono	47	2012	57	11	2014	Free	
22	DF	(Australia)	Dean Heffernan	46	2013	14	0	2014	Free	
23	MF	(Australia)	Jason Trifiro	38	2012	29	0	2014	Free	
33	DF	(Australia)	Daniel Mullen	37	2014	6	0	2016	Free	
34	FW	(Australia)	Golgol Mebrahtu	36	2014	1	0	2016	Free	
35	DF	(Australia)	Antony Golec	36	2014	7	0	2014	Free	

- Last updated: 14 May 2014
- Source: westsydneyfootball.com

=== From youth squad ===
N	Pos.	Nat.	Name	Age	Notes
24	MF	(Australia)	Nicholas Olsen	31	
25	MF	(Australia)	Jake McGing	32	
26	FW	(Australia)	Jaushua Sotirio	31	
29	FW	(Australia)	Mark Cindric	31	
30	GK	(Australia)	Thomas Manos	30	
31	MF	(Australia)	Alusine Fofanah	28	
32	DF	(Australia)	Daniel Alessi	29	

=== Transfers in ===
No.	Pos.	Nat.	Name	Age	Moving from	Type	Transfer window	Ends	Transfer fee	Source
9	FW	(Australia)	Tomi Juric	35	Adelaide United (Australia)	Transfer	Pre-season	2015	Free	footballaustralia.com.au
11	FW	(Australia)	Brendon Šantalab	44	Chongqing Lifan (China)	Transfer	Pre-season	2014	Free	footballaustralia.com.au
22	DF	(Australia)	Dean Heffernan	46	Perth Glory (Australia)	Transfer	Pre-season	2014	Free	footballaustralia.com.au
13	DF	(Australia)	Matthew Špiranović	38	Al-Arabi (Qatar)	Transfer	Pre-season	2014	Free	footballaustralia.com.au
34	FW	(Australia)	Golgol Mebrahtu	36	Melbourne Heart (Australia)	Transfer	Mid-season	2016	Free	footballaustralia.com.au
33	DF	(Australia)	Daniel Mullen	37	Dalian Aerbin (China)	Transfer	Mid-season	2016	Free	footballaustralia.com.au
35	DF	(Australia)	Antony Golec	36	Adelaide United (Australia)	Transfer	Mid-season	2014	Free	footballaustralia.com.au

=== Transfers out ===
No.	Pos.	Nat.	Name	Age	Moving to	Type	Transfer window	Transfer fee	Source
9	FW	(Croatia)	Dino Kresinger	31	Zavrč (Slovenia)	End of contract	Pre-season	Free	footballaustralia.com.au
11	DF	(Australia)	Tarek Elrich	26	Adelaide United (Australia)	End of contract	Pre-season	Free	footballaustralia.com.au
13	MF	(Australia)	Joey Gibbs	20	Newcastle Jets (Australia)	End of contract	Pre-season	Free	footballaustralia.com.au
16	MF	(Australia)	Rocky Visconte	22	Croydon Kings	End of contract	Pre-season	Free	footballaustralia.com.au
15	DF	(Australia)	Reece Caira	20	Wellington Phoenix (Australia)	Free Transfer	Pre-season	Free	footballaustralia.com.au
30	GK	(Australia)	Carlos Saliadarre	19		End of contract	Pre-season		

== Technical staff ==
Position	Name
Manager	(Australia) Tony Popovic
Assistant manager	(Australia) Ante Milicic
Goalkeeping coach	(Australia) Ron Corry
Strength & Conditioning Coach	(Australia) Adam Waterson
Physiotherapist	(Australia) David Hughes

== Statistics ==
=== Squad statistics ===
N	Pos.	Nat.	Name	Total					A-League					AFC Champions League
N	Pos.	Nat.	Name	Apps	Goals	Yellow card	Second yellow card	Red card	Apps	Goals	Yellow card	Second yellow card	Red card	Apps	Goals	Yellow card	Second yellow card	Red card
1	GK	(Australia)	Ante Covic	40	0	0	0	0	28	0	0	0	0	12	0	0	0	0
2	DF	(Australia)	Shannon Cole	25	4	7	0	0	10+2	1	5	0	0	9+4	3	2	0	0
3	DF	(Australia)	Adam D'Apuzzo	26	0	9	0	0	24+1	0	8	0	0	1	0	1	0	0
4	DF	(Australia)	Nikolai Topor-Stanley	37	3	6	0	0	28	2	5	0	0	9	1	1	0	0
5	DF	(Australia)	Michael Beauchamp	20	1	0	0	0	13	1	0	0	0	7	0	0	0	0
6	MF	(Germany)	Jérome Polenz	25	2	9	0	0	22	2	9	0	0	2+1	0	0	0	0
7	FW	(Australia)	Labinot Haliti	38	4	2	0	0	8+16	1	2	0	0	13+1	3	0	0	0
8	MF	(Croatia)	Mateo Poljak	28	2	8	0	0	20+2	1	6	0	0	6	1	2	0	0
9	FW	(Australia)	Tomi Juric	29	12	7	0	0	10+10	8	5	0	0	6+3	4	2	0	0
10	MF	(Australia)	Aaron Mooy	31	4	6	0	0	22+4	3	6	0	0	1+4	1	0	0	0
11	FW	(Australia)	Brendon Šantalab	34	8	9	0	0	15+10	5	6	0	0	5+4	3	3	0	0
12	FW	(Australia)	Tahj Minniecon	11	0	0	0	0	4+7	0	0	0	0	0	0	0	0	0
13	DF	(Australia)	Matthew Spiranovic	25	1	7	0	0	18	1	5	0	0	4+3	0	2	0	0
14	FW	(Australia)	Kwabena Appiah	22	0	0	0	0	3+7	0	0	0	0	9+3	0	0	0	0
15	MF	(Australia)	Yianni Perkatis	0	0	0	0	0	0	0	0	0	0	0	0	0	0	0
16	MF	(Australia)	Josh Barresi	0	0	0	0	0	0	0	0	0	0	0	0	0	0	0
17	MF	(Netherlands)	Youssouf Hersi	29	3	5	0	0	20+4	3	5	0	0	2+3	0	0	0	0
18	DF	(Italy)	Iacopo La Rocca	33	2	7	0	0	18+2	2	3	0	0	12+1	0	4	0	0
19	FW	(Australia)	Mark Bridge	35	7	5	0	0	24+2	5	4	0	0	9	2	1	0	0
20	GK	(Australia)	Jerrad Tyson	3	0	1	0	0	1	0	1	0	0	2	0	0	0	0
21	MF	(Japan)	Shinji Ono	31	3	3	0	0	20+5	2	2	0	0	4+2	1	1	0	0
22	DF	(Australia)	Dean Heffernan	14	0	3	0	0	6+3	0	1	0	0	4+1	0	2	0	0
23	MF	(Australia)	Jason Trifiro	16	0	0	0	0	2+6	0	0	0	0	7+1	0	0	0	0
26	MF	(Australia)	Jaushua Sotirio	2	0	0	0	0	0+1	0	0	0	0	0+1	0	0	0	0
31	MF	(Australia)	Alusine Fofanah	1	0	0	0	0	1	0	0	0	0	0	0	0	0	0
32	DF	(Australia)	Daniel Alessi	5	0	1	0	0	2+1	0	0	0	0	0+2	0	1	0	0
33	DF	(Australia)	Daniel Mullen	10	0	1	0	0	0	0	0	0	0	10	0	1	0	0
34	FW	(Australia)	Golgol Mebrahtu	1	0	0	0	0	0+1	0	0	0	0	0	0	0	0	0
35	DF	(Australia)	Antony Golec	13	0	1	0	0	0	0	0	0	0	13	0	1	0	0
5	DF	(Australia)	Brendan Hamill	6	0	1	0	0	0	0	0	0	0	6	0	1	0	0
10	MF	(Brazil)	Vítor Saba	6	0	1	0	0	0	0	0	0	0	1+5	0	1	0	0

- Last updated: 2 November 2014
- Source: au.soccerway.com
- (yellow card) = Number of bookings; (second yellow card) = Number of sending offs after a second yellow card; (red card) = Number of sending offs by a direct red card.
1. Joined the club from 2014–15 season.

== Pre-season and friendlies ==
7 August 2013 Friendly	Macarthur Rams (Australia)	0–2	(Australia) Western Sydney Wanderers	Sydney
19:30 AEST		Report	Cole 32'; Bridge 70'	Stadium: Campbelltown Stadium; Attendance: 4,597; Referee: Kris Griffiths-Jones

14 August 2013 Friendly	Canberra Olympic (Australia)	1–3	(Australia) Western Sydney Wanderers	Canberra
18:15 AEST	Shields 25'	Report	Haliti 8'; Juric 80'; Bridge 90+3'	Stadium: AIS Athletics Field; Attendance: 1,800; Referee: Richard Naumovski

21 August 2013 Friendly	Western Sydney Wanderers (Australia)	2–1	(New Zealand) Wellington Phoenix	Sydney
19:15 AEST	Šantalab 84', 90+3'	Report	Fenton 81'	Stadium: Lily Homes Stadium; Attendance: 4,000; Referee: Kris Griffiths-Jones

4 September 2013 Asian Tour	Shimizu S-Pulse (Japan)	2–2	(Australia) Western Sydney Wanderers	Shimizu
	Murata 36'; Hattanda 88'	Report	Juric 30'; Appiah-Kubi 45'	Stadium: Outsourcing Stadium Nihondaira; Attendance: 4,000

8 September 2013 Asian Tour	Guangzhou R&F (China)	0–5	(Australia) Western Sydney Wanderers	Guangzhou
		Report	Šantalab 51'; Haliti 58', 60'; Hersi 68', 88'	Stadium: Yuexiushan Stadium; Attendance: 2,000

12 September 2013 Asian Tour	Tokyo Verdy (Japan)	2–1	(Australia) Western Sydney Wanderers	Chōfu
	Yoshino 19'; Takahara 20'	Report	Šantalab 61'	Stadium: Ajinomoto Stadium; Attendance: 200

22 September 2013 Friendly	Western Sydney Wanderers (Australia)	1–1	(Australia) Adelaide United	Penrith
14:00 AEST	Boogaard 7' (o.g.)	Report	Cirio 47'	Stadium: Centrebet Stadium; Attendance: 7,000; Referee: Strebre Delovski

29 September 2013 Friendly	Melbourne Victory (Australia)	3–0	(Australia) Western Sydney Wanderers	Kingston
14:00 AEST	Nichols 1'; Barbarouses 27'; Čović 76' (o.g.)	Report		Stadium: Twin Ovals; Attendance: 5,290

3 October 2013 Friendly	Bankstown City Lions (Australia)	0–2	(Australia) Western Sydney Wanderers	Sydney
19:15 AEDT		Report; Report	Mooy 41'; Juric 47'	Stadium: Jensen Oval; Attendance: 1,200

== Competitions ==
=== Overall ===
Competition	Started round	Final position / round	First match	Last match
A-League	—	2nd	12 October 2013	12 April 2014
A-League Finals Series	Semi-finals	Runners-up	26 April 2014	4 May 2014
AFC Champions League	Group stage	Winners	26 February 2014	1 November 2014
National Youth League	—	6th	27 October 2013	1 March 2014

=== A-League ===
==== League table ====
Pos	Team	Pld	W	D	L	GF	GA	GD	Pts	Qualification
1	Brisbane Roar (C)	27	16	4	7	43	25	+18	52	Qualificaition for 2015 AFC Champions League group stage and finals series
2	Western Sydney Wanderers	27	11	9	7	34	29	+5	42	Qualificaition for 2015 AFC Champions League group stage and finals series
3	Central Coast Mariners	27	12	6	9	33	36	−3	42	Qualification for 2015 AFC Champions League qualifying play-off and finals series (Note: Since the winner of 2014 A-League Grand Final (Brisbane Roar) qualified for the 2015 AFC Champions League group stage, the 2nd and 3rd placed teams qualified for the group stage and the qualifying play-off of 2015 AFC Champions League.)
4	Melbourne Victory	27	11	8	8	42	43	−1	41	Qualification for Finals series
5	Sydney FC	27	12	3	12	40	38	+2	39	Qualification for Finals series
6	Adelaide United	27	10	8	9	45	36	+9	38	Qualification for Finals series
7	Newcastle Jets	27	10	6	11	34	34	0	36	
8	Perth Glory	27	7	7	13	28	37	−9	28	
9	Wellington Phoenix (Note: Wellington Phoenix cannot qualify for the AFC Champions League as they are not recognised as an AFC club.)	27	7	7	13	36	51	−15	28	
10	Melbourne Heart	27	6	8	13	36	42	−6	26	

Updated to match(es) played on 13 April 2014. Source: ultimatealeague.com
Rules for classification: 1) points; 2) goal difference; 3) number of goals scored.
(C) Champions

==== Results summary ====
Overall								Home						Away					
Pld	W	D	L	GF	GA	GD	Pts	W	D	L	GF	GA	GD	W	D	L	GF	GA	GD
27	11	9	7	34	29	+5	42	6	5	2	17	11	+6	5	4	5	17	18	−1

Last updated: 12 April 2014.
Source: Competitive matches

==== Results by round ====
Round	1	2	3	4	5	6	7	8	9	10	11	12	13	14	15	16	17	18	19	20	21	22	23	24	25	26	27
Ground	A	H	A	H	A	H	A	A	H	A	H	A	H	H	A	H	A	H	A	A	H	A	H	H	A	H	A
Result	D	D	W	W	W	W	L	D	D	W	W	D	L	W	L	W	D	D	L	W	L	L	D	W	L	D	W
Position	4	5	2	2	2	1	2	2	2	2	2	2	2	2	2	2	2	2	2	2	2	2	3	2	3	2	2

Updated to match(es) played on 12 April 2014. Source: Matches
A = Away; H = Home; W = Win; D = Draw; L = Loss

==== Matches ====
12 October 2013 1	Central Coast Mariners	1–1	Western Sydney Wanderers	Gosford
17:30 AEDT	Duke 55'	Report	Juric 87'	Stadium: Bluetongue Stadium; Attendance: 17,134; Referee: Kris Griffiths-Jones

20 October 2013 2	Western Sydney Wanderers	1–1	Wellington Phoenix	Sydney
17:00 AEDT	Polenz 16'	Report	Brockie 60'	Stadium: Pirtek Stadium; Attendance: 16,294; Referee: Jarred Gillett

26 October 2013 3	Sydney FC	0–2	Western Sydney Wanderers	Sydney
19:30 AEDT		Report	La Rocca 11'; Ono 26'	Stadium: Allianz Stadium; Attendance: 40,388; Referee: Strebre Delovski

1 November 2013 4	Western Sydney Wanderers	2–1	Adelaide United	Sydney
19:30 AEDT	Juric 60', 80'	Report	Carrusca 54'	Stadium: Pirtek Stadium; Attendance: 16,279; Referee: Jarred Gillett

8 November 2013 5	Melbourne Heart	0–1	Western Sydney Wanderers	Melbourne
19:30 AEDT		Report	Cole 27'	Stadium: AAMI Park; Attendance: 8,070; Referee: Peter O'Leary

16 November 2013 6	Western Sydney Wanderers	1–0	Melbourne Victory	Sydney
19:45 AEDT	Bridge 82'	Report		Stadium: Pirtek Stadium; Attendance: 15,854; Referee: Kris Griffiths-Jones

22 November 2013 7	Brisbane Roar	3–1	Western Sydney Wanderers	Brisbane
20:00 AEDT	Berisha 5'; Franjić 19'; Yeboah 90+1'	Report	Šantalab 28'	Stadium: Suncorp Stadium; Attendance: 19,066; Referee: Strebre Delovski

1 December 2013 8	Wellington Phoenix	0–0	Western Sydney Wanderers	Wellington
15:00 AEDT		Report		Stadium: Westpac Stadium; Attendance: 7,147; Referee: Lucien Laverdure

7 December 2013 9	Western Sydney Wanderers	1–1	Melbourne Heart	Sydney
17:30 AEDT	Mooy 44'	Report	Williams 38'	Stadium: Pirtek Stadium; Attendance: 14,549; Referee: Kris Griffiths-Jones

14 December 2013 10	Newcastle Jets	0–1	Western Sydney Wanderers	Newcastle
19:30 AEDT		Report	Bridge 33'	Stadium: Hunter Stadium; Attendance: 16,634; Referee: Jarred Gillett

23 December 2013 11	Western Sydney Wanderers	2–0	Central Coast Mariners	Sydney
19:00 AEDT	Juric 20'; Hersi 33'	Report		Stadium: Pirtek Stadium; Attendance: 15,786; Referee: Strebre Delovski

28 December 2013 12	Melbourne Victory	1–1	Western Sydney Wanderers	Melbourne
19:30 AEDT	Finkler 90+4'	Report	Šantalab 71'	Stadium: AAMI Park; Attendance: 22,133; Referee: Peter Green

1 January 2014 13	Western Sydney Wanderers	1–3	Wellington Phoenix	Sydney
19:00 AEDT	Bridge 62'	Report	Boyd 68'; Huysegems 78', 84'	Stadium: Pirtek Stadium; Attendance: 14,151; Referee: Lucien Laverdure

11 January 2014 14	Western Sydney Wanderers	1–0	Sydney FC	Sydney
19:30 AEDT	Šantalab 86'	Report		Stadium: Pirtek Stadium; Attendance: 18,080; Referee: Jarred Gillett

19 January 2014 15	Adelaide United	1–0	Western Sydney Wanderers	Adelaide
17:00 AEDT	Carrusca 4'	Report		Stadium: Coopers Stadium; Attendance: 11,356; Referee: Peter Green

26 January 2014 16	Western Sydney Wanderers	3–1	Perth Glory	Sydney
19:00 AEDT	Šantalab 28'; Mooy 35'; Bridge 71' (pen.)	Report	Smeltz 56'	Stadium: Pirtek Stadium; Attendance: 14,111; Referee: Strebre Delovski

1 February 2014 17	Newcastle Jets	2–2	Western Sydney Wanderers	Newcastle
19:30 AEDT	Taggart 26', 90'; J. Griffiths (red card) 90+4'	Report	Mooy 45'; Beauchamp 65'	Stadium: Hunter Stadium; Attendance: 15,924; Referee: Ben Williams

7 February 2014 18	Western Sydney Wanderers	1–1	Brisbane Roar	Sydney
19:30 AEDT	Haliti 85'	Report	Berisha 13'	Stadium: Pirtek Stadium; Attendance: 16,401; Referee: Kris Griffiths-Jones

14 January 2014; Rescheduled 19	Melbourne Victory	3–1	Western Sydney Wanderers	Melbourne
19:30 AEDT	A. Thompson 52'; Barbarouses 62'; Finkler 90+5'	Report	Juric 90+4'	Stadium: AAMI Park; Attendance: 14,774; Referee: Ben Williams

22 February 2014 20	Perth Glory	0–2	Western Sydney Wanderers	Perth
21:30 AEDT		Report	Poljak 12'; Juric 70'	Stadium: nib Stadium; Attendance: 8,543; Referee: Shaun Evans

2 March 2014 21	Western Sydney Wanderers	0–2	Newcastle Jets	Sydney
17:00 AEDT		Report	Jaliens 37'; Taggart 64'	Stadium: Pirtek Stadium; Attendance: 12,079; Referee: Chris Beath

8 March 2014 22	Sydney FC	3–1	Western Sydney Wanderers	Sydney
19:30 AEDT	Jurman 59'; Garcia 75'; Abbas 90+3' (pen.)	Report	Ono 49'	Stadium: Allianz Stadium; Attendance: 40,285; Referee: Kris Griffiths-Jones

15 March 2014 23	Western Sydney Wanderers	0–0	Adelaide United	Sydney
17:30 AEDT		Report		Stadium: Pirtek Stadium; Attendance: 11,892; Referee: Strebre Delovski

23 March 2014 24	Western Sydney Wanderers	3–0	Perth Glory	Sydney
17:00 AEDT	Polenz 42'; Bridge 61'; Juric 78'	Report		Stadium: Pirtek Stadium; Attendance: 12,128; Referee: Tim McGilchrist

29 March 2014 25	Central Coast Mariners	2–1	Western Sydney Wanderers	Gosford
17:30 AEDT	Rose 32'; Ibini 90'	Report	Topor-Stanley 40'	Stadium: Central Coast Stadium; Attendance: 13,157; Referee: Strebre Delovski

5 April 2014 26	Western Sydney Wanderers	1–1	Brisbane Roar	Sydney
19:30 AEDT	Juric 61'	Report	Miller 35'	Stadium: Pirtek Stadium; Attendance: 15,573; Referee: Peter Green

12 April 2014 27	Melbourne Heart	2–3	Western Sydney Wanderers	Melbourne
17:30 AEST	Engelaar 34'; Hoffman 72'	Report	Topor-Stanley 27'; Šantalab 81'; Hersi 86'	Stadium: AAMI Park; Attendance: 10,003

==== Finals Series ====
25 April 2014 Semi-final	Western Sydney Wanderers	2–0	Central Coast Mariners	Sydney
19:30 AEST	Hersi 31'; La Rocca 81'	Report		Stadium: Parramatta Stadium; Attendance: 19,216; Referee: Kris Griffiths-Jones

4 May 2014 Grand Final	Brisbane Roar	2–1 (a.e.t.)	Western Sydney Wanderers	Brisbane
19:30 AEST	Berisha 86'; Henrique 108'	Report	Špiranović 56'	Stadium: Suncorp Stadium; Attendance: 51,153; Referee: Peter Green

=== AFC Champions League ===
==== Group stage ====
Pos	Team	Pld	W	D	L	GF	GA	GD	Pts	Qualification
1	(Australia) Western Sydney Wanderers	6	4	0	2	11	5	+6	12	Advance to knockout stage
2	(Japan) Kawasaki Frontale	6	4	0	2	7	5	+2	12	Advance to knockout stage
3	(South Korea) Ulsan Hyundai	6	2	1	3	8	10	−2	7	
4	(China) Guizhou Renhe	6	1	1	4	4	10	−6	4	

26 February 2014 1	Western Sydney Wanderers (Australia)	1–3	(South Korea) Ulsan Hyundai	Sydney, Australia
19:30 AEDT	Šantalab 1'	Report	Shin-Wook 35'; Chang-Hyun 43'; Min-Soo 66'	Stadium: Parramatta Stadium; Attendance: 11,212; Referee: Abdullah Al Hilali (Oman)

12 March 2014 2	Guizhou Renhe (China)	0–1	(Australia) Western Sydney Wanderers	Guizhou, China
23:00 AEDT		Report	Bridge 10'	Stadium: Guiyang Olympic Sports Center; Attendance: 21,184; Referee: Muhammad Taqi Aljaafari Bin Jahari (Singapore)

19 March 2014 3	Western Sydney Wanderers (Australia)	1–0	(Japan) Kawasaki Frontale	Sydney, Australia
19:30 AEDT	Haliti 3'	Report		Stadium: Parramatta Stadium; Attendance: 9,292; Referee: Liu Kwok Man (Hong Kong)

1 April 2014 4	Kawasaki Frontale (Japan)	2–1	(Australia) Western Sydney Wanderers	Kawasaki, Japan
21:00 AEDT	Nakamura 74'; Oshima 88'	Report	Haliti 24'	Stadium: Todoroki Athletics Stadium; Referee: Ali Abdulnabi (Bahrain)

15 April 2014 5	Ulsan Hyundai (South Korea)	0–2	(Australia) Western Sydney Wanderers	Ulsan, South Korea
20:30 AEST		Report	Bridge 61'; Šantalab 80'	Stadium: Ulsan Munsu Football Stadium; Referee: Abdullah Balideh (Qatar)

22 April 2014 6	Western Sydney Wanderers (Australia)	5–0	(China) Guizhou Renhe	Sydney, Australia
19:30 AEST	Cole 6'; Haliti 75'; Mooy 80' (pen.); Ono 85'; Topor-Stanley 88'	Report		Stadium: Parramatta Stadium; Attendance: 11,099; Referee: Alireza Faghani (Iran)

==== Round of 16 ====
7 May 2014 First leg	Sanfrecce Hiroshima (Japan)	3–1	(Australia) Western Sydney Wanderers	Hiroshima, Japan
19:00 UTC+9	Ishihara 51', 65'; Shibasaki 90+1'	Report	Juric 78' (pen.)	Stadium: Hiroshima Big Arch; Attendance: 8,423; Referee: Abdullah Al Hilali (Oman)

14 May 2014 Second leg	Western Sydney Wanderers (Australia)	2–0 (3a–3 agg.)	(Japan) Sanfrecce Hiroshima	Sydney, Australia
19:30 UTC+10	Cole 55'; Šantalab 85'	Report		Stadium: Parramatta Stadium; Attendance: 10,639; Referee: Nawaf Shukralla (Bahrain)

==== Quarter-finals ====
20 August 2014 First leg	Western Sydney Wanderers (Australia)	1–0	(China) Guangzhou Evergrande	Sydney, Australia
19:30 AEST	Juric 60'	Report	Zhang Linpeng (red card) 88'; Gao Lin (red card) 90+1'	Stadium: Parramatta Stadium; Attendance: 17,093; Referee: Abdulla Hassan Mohamed (United Arab Emirates)

27 August 2014 Second leg	Guangzhou Evergrande (China)	2–1 (2–2a agg.)	(Australia) Western Sydney Wanderers	Guangzhou, China
22:00 AEST	Diamanti 62'; Elkeson 90+2'	Report	Juric 58' (pen.)	Stadium: Tianhe Stadium; Attendance: 39,874; Referee: Ryuji Sato (Japan)

==== Semi-finals ====
17 September 2014 First leg	FC Seoul (South Korea)	0–0	(Australia) Western Sydney Wanderers	Seoul, South Korea
20:30 AEST		Report		Stadium: Seoul World Cup Stadium; Attendance: 12,901; Referee: Nawaf Shukralla (Bahrain)

1 October 2014 Second leg	Western Sydney Wanderers (Australia)	2–0 (2–0 agg.)	(South Korea) FC Seoul	Sydney, Australia
19:30 AEST	Poljak 3'; Cole 64'	Report		Stadium: Parramatta Stadium; Attendance: 18,986; Referee: Abdulrahman Abdou (Qatar)

==== Final ====
25 October 2014 First leg	Western Sydney Wanderers (Australia)	1–0	(Saudi Arabia) Al-Hilal	Sydney, Australia
19:30 AEDT	Juric 64'	Report		Stadium: Parramatta Stadium; Attendance: 20,053; Referee: Alireza Faghani (Iran)

1 November 2014 Second leg	Al-Hilal (Saudi Arabia)	0–0 (0–1 agg.)	(Australia) Western Sydney Wanderers	Riyadh, Saudi Arabia
04:30 AEDT		Report		Stadium: King Fahd International Stadium; Attendance: 63,763; Referee: Yuichi Nishimura (Japan)

== See also ==
- 2013–14 Western Sydney Wanderers W-League season

== Awards ==
- Player of the Week (Round 3) – Shinji Ono
- Player of the Week (Round 4) – Tomi Juric
- Player of the Week (Round 11) – Tomi Juric
- Player of the Week (Round 14) – Youssouf Hersi
