= Shayne D'Cunha =

Indian-born Australian soccer player

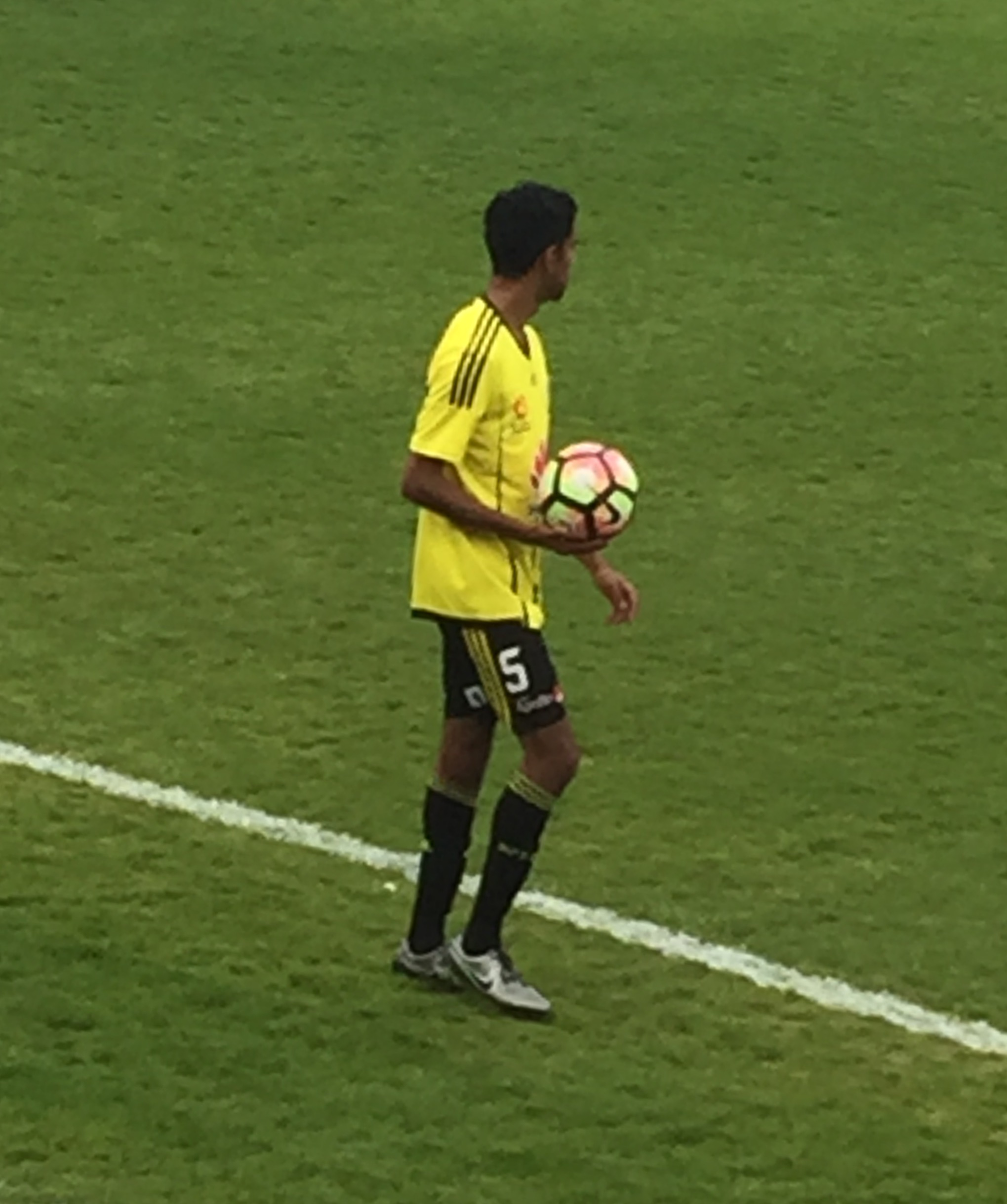
- D'Cunha playing for Wellington Phoenix in 2016

Personal information
- Full name: Shayne Warren Tiber D’Cunha
- Date of birth: 1 April 1996 (age 30)
- Place of birth: Mumbai, Maharashtra, India
- Position: Right back

Youth career
- –2014: Blacktown City
- 2014–2015: Western Sydney Wanderers

Senior career*
Years	Team	Apps	(Gls)
2013–2014	Blacktown City	19	(2)
2015–2016	Western Sydney Wanderers	2	(0)
2016	Western Sydney Wanderers NPL	10	(1)
2016–2017	Blacktown City	19	(2)

International career^{‡}
2014	Australia U-20	5	(0)
- * Club domestic league appearances and goals as of 20 September 2017 ‡ National team caps and goals as of 11 April 2015

Shayne Warren Tiber D'Cunha (born 1 April 1996) is an Indian-born Australian former professional soccer player who most notably played as a defender for Western Sydney Wanderers in the A-League. Born in India, he represented Australia at youth level internationally.

== Career ==
Born in Mumbai, Maharashtra in India, D'Cunha moved to Sydney, Australia with his parents in 2000 when he was four years old. His parents moved their family to Australia in order to give their children a better chance at life. D'Cunha started playing football at the local level at the age of five or six and soon choose it as his sport of preference over cricket. Eventually, D'Cunha joined the youth ranks of the Western Sydney Wanderers and played for Blacktown City.

D'Cunha was one of three players released by the Wanderers on 1 June 2016, along with Daniel Alessi and Alusine Fofanah.

In September 2016, D'Cunha joined Wellington Phoenix on trial.

== International ==
D'Cunha has stated that had he thought about representing India internationally but after getting capped by Australia at the under-20 level, he pledged his allegiance to Australia.

== Personal life ==
D'Cunha attended the prestigious selective secondary school, North Sydney Boys High School in Crows Nest (North Shore) and graduated in 2014. He is one of the most recent alumni for the school, having represented Australia at an international level.

Shayne joined the Seminary of the Good Shepherd in Homebush to study for the Catholic priesthood in 2019.

Shayne was ordained as a transitional deacon for the Diocese of Broken Bay by Bishop Anthony Randazzo on Friday, 12 September 2025.

Shayne was ordained as a priest for the Diocese of Broken Bay by Archbishop Anthony Randazzo, (Prefect for the Dicastery of Legislative Texts & Apostolic Administrator of the Diocese of Broken Bay) on Wednesday, 29 April 2026.

== Honours ==
Blacktown City

- National Premier Leagues NSW: 2014, 2016
- Waratah Cup: 2014
