= Nikolai Topor-Stanley =

Australian soccer player (born 1985)

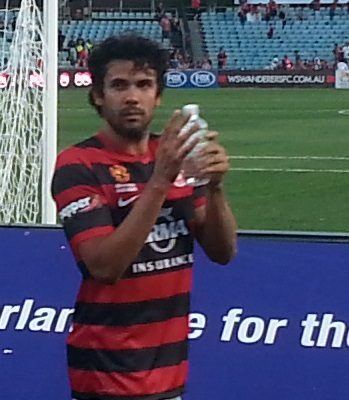
- Topor-Stanley with Western Sydney Wanderers in 2013

Personal information
- Full name: Nikolai David Topor-Stanley
- Date of birth: 11 March 1985 (age 41)
- Place of birth: Canberra, Australian Capital Territory, Australia
- Height: 1.91 m (6 ft 3 in)
- Position: Centre-back

Youth career
- Tuggeranong United
- 1999–2000: Woden Valley
- 2000: Canberra Olympic
- 2001: Belconnen
- 2002: ACTAS
- 2002–2003: AIS

Senior career*
Years	Team	Apps	(Gls)
2004	Belconnen	26	(1)
2005	Manly United	29	(0)
2006–2007	Sydney FC	14	(0)
2007–2009	Perth Glory	37	(0)
2009–2012	Newcastle Jets	81	(4)
2012–2016	Western Sydney Wanderers	104	(3)
2016–2017	Hatta Club	22	(0)
2017–2021	Newcastle Jets	105	(4)
2021–2023	Western United	36	(1)
2023–2025	Lambton Jaffas	37	(3)

International career
2004–2005	Australia U20	2	(0)
2006–2008	Australia U23	26	(4)
2008–2014	Australia	4	(0)
- * Club domestic league appearances and goals

Nikolai David Topor-Stanley (born 11 March 1985) is an Australian former soccer player who played as a centre-back. He played for A-League clubs Sydney FC, Perth Glory, Newcastle Jets, Western Sydney Wanderers and Western United, where he has amassed 380 appearances, the second most of any player behind Leigh Broxham. He has also played in international squads, the Olyroos and Socceroos, for Australia.

== Early life ==
Stanley was born in Canberra on 11 March 1985 to a Mauritian father, and a Polish-German mother. He holds dual Australian-Mauritian nationality.

== Club career ==
=== Sydney FC ===
Stanley has had several short-term contracts with A-League club Sydney FC, firstly as a replacement for injured Jacob Timpano, and then Ruben Zadkovich, but was not signed by former Sydney FC coach Terry Butcher on a reported long-term deal despite his "outstanding performance" because of the club's salary cap problems. He is a defender and has previously played for NSW Premier League teams Manly United FC and Belconnen Blue Devils, as well as representing Australia in the 2005 FIFA World Youth Championship. He was also selected to participate in the first training camp for the Beijing Olympics.

On 15 July 2006, Topor-Stanley debuted for Sydney off the bench against Queensland Roar in the Pre-season Cup before scoring his first goal for the club against Newcastle Jets a week later. Topor-Stanley made his A-League debut on 27 August 2006 against the Central Coast Mariners. In the absence of Timpano, Topor-Stanley cemented a place in Sydney's first team, having started a number of Sydney FC's games in the 2006–07 A-League.

Sydney coach Butcher was apparently "fuming" after hearing that he had developed a foot injury at an Olyroos training session before the first semi-final against Newcastle Jets. In the first qualifying game against Taiwan in Adelaide on 7 February 2007, Topor-Stanley scored two of the 11 goals – one with each foot.

=== Perth Glory ===
Stanley was rumoured to be following Sasho Petrovski and Alvin Ceccoli out of Sydney FC and it was confirmed on 1 April 2007 that he has signed on with A-League rival team, Perth Glory on a two-year deal. He left Sydney due to the contract which was offered to him by the club which was less than the amount he was being paid as a replacement player during the first season. Topor-Stanley will continue to represent Sydney until after Sydney's participation in the 2007 Asian Champions League. He is a "victim of a club-versus-country tug of war," according to Branko Culina, flying from country to country in between Olyroos and Sydney FC matches, along with fellow Sydney and Olyroos player Mark Milligan. Fellow Sydney FC player Mark Rudan was quoted as saying, "Nikolai Topor-Stanley will be a pretty big loss for us and again we seem to be losing players and not getting them."

He was praised as a new player for Perth Glory at the beginning of the 2007-08 season of the A-League, along with Jimmy Downey, and was nicknamed Nikolai "Gandhi" Topor-Stanley by his teammates. Only several matches into the A-League season, however, he took an ankle injury whilst playing for the Olyroos, but was able to play his next match against Iraq. "Outstanding young Perth Glory defender Nikolai Topor-Stanley has capped off a wonderful season by claiming the 2007/08 'Most Glorious Player' Award, along with a host of other accolades, at the club’s presentation evening on Friday. The event belonged to Topor-Stanley as he scooped the pool with three awards in his debut season with Perth, adding the 'Players' Player of the Year' and 'Young Player of the Year' to his 'Most Glorious Player' award."

=== Newcastle Jets ===
On 8 January 2009, Topor-Stanley signed a two-year contract with Newcastle Jets. The assistant coach at the club 'rates Nikolai Topor-Stanley one of the best centre-backs in Australia and believes he is the perfect man to fix the club's defensive woes.'. Playing for the Jets would enable Topor-Stanley to compete in the Asian Champions League for the second time, the first being with Sydney FC in 2006.

In a penalty shoot-out on 20 February 2010, Topor-Stanley scored the goal that earned Newcastle Jets the right to go into the A-League 2010 semi-finals. This was his first goal in 88 games for the Newcastle Jets.

On 27 November 2010, Topor-Stanley captained the Jets to defeat to LA Galaxy at Energy Stadium before a record crowd.

=== Western Sydney Wanderers ===
On 22 June 2012, he was released by his club, Newcastle Jets. On 30 June 2012 it was announced he had signed with the newly formed Western Sydney Wanderers A-League franchise.

On 20 July 2013, Topor-Stanley started for the A-League All Stars in the inaugural A-League All Stars Game against Manchester United, a match in which the A-League All Stars were thrashed 5–1, courtesy of goals from Danny Welbeck, Jesse Lingard and Robin van Persie. Topor-Stanley was substituted off in the 73rd minute of the match, and was replaced by Melbourne Heart forward David Williams.

Topor-Stanley captained the Western Sydney Wanderers during the 2014 season, replacing Michael Beauchamp. His captaincy continued into 2015. Under his captaincy, the Wanderers defeated Al Hilal SFC in Riyadh to win the Asian Champions League.

=== Hatta Club ===
In October 2016, Topor-Stanley left the Wanderers to join UAE Arabian Gulf League side Hatta Club.

=== 2017: Return to Newcastle Jets ===
After one season, Topor-Stanley returned to the A-League, signing a two-year deal with Newcastle Jets in June 2017.

=== 2021–: Western United FC ===
Topor-Stanley played for Western United FC in Melbourne for the 2021–22 season, and has signed to play for the 2022–23 season.

Topor-Stanley announced his retirement at the end of the season on 19 April 2023, after two seasons at Western United.

== International career ==
Topor-Stanley contributed significantly to the Olyroos' win over Saudi Arabia at Hindmarsh Stadium on 28 March 2007 by scoring the first goal, a header from the near post in the 74th minute of the game.

He was part of the Olyroos squad that represented Australia at the Beijing Olympics in 2008.

In 2008, Topor-Stanley was named in Pim Verbeek's preliminary Australian squad which opened their World Cup qualifying campaign against Qatar on Wednesday 6 February in Melbourne but made his international debut against Singapore in March 2008. Socceroos coach Pim Verbeek included Topor-Stanley in the Socceroos squad that drew 0–0 against China in Kunming on 26 March 2008, that won against Ghana on and lost to China in Sydney on Sunday 22 June 2008. Topor-Stanley is the most capped Olyroos player representing Australia at the 2008 Beijing Olympic Games. Verbeek selected Topor-Stanley for the Socceroos squad that played Indonesia to a nil-all draw on 28 January 2009 and for the squad that went on to play Kuwait in Canberra on 5 March 2009.

Australia coach Ange Postecoglou revealed that Topor-Stanley could have made his return to the Socceroos at the World Cup but for his injury in the A-League grand final.

In September 2014, Topor-Stanley was recalled to the Socceroos squad by Postecoglou to play UAE in UAE and Qatar in Qatar. In December 2014, Topor-Stanley was named in the provisional Socceroos Asian Cup squad.

== Career statistics ==
As of mid 2024

Appearances and goals by club, season and competition
Club	Season	League		Cup		Asia (Note: AFC Champions League statistics are included in season ending during group stages (i.e. ACL 2009 and A-League season 2008–2009 etc.))		CWC		Total	
Club	Season	Apps	Goals	Apps	Goals	Apps	Goals	Apps	Goals	Apps	Goals
Sydney FC	2006–07	14	0	6	1	0	0			20	1
Perth Glory	2007–08	16	0	4	0					20	0
Perth Glory	2008–09	21	0	0	0					21	0
Perth Glory	Total	37	0	4	0	0	0	0	0	41	0
Newcastle Jets	2008–09	0	0			6	0			6	0
Newcastle Jets	2009–10	28	0							28	0
Newcastle Jets	2010–11	28	2							28	2
Newcastle Jets	2011–12	25	2							25	2
Newcastle Jets	Total	81	4	0	0	6	0	0	0	87	4
Western Sydney Wanderers	2012–13	29	1							29	1
Western Sydney Wanderers	2013–14	28	2			9	1			37	3
Western Sydney Wanderers	2014–15	20	0	1	0	6	0	1	0	28	0
Western Sydney Wanderers	2015–16	27	0	1	0					28	0
Western Sydney Wanderers	2016–17	0	0	3	0					3	0
Western Sydney Wanderers	Total	104	3	5	0	15	1	1	0	125	4
Hatta Club	2016–17	22	0	0	0					22	0
Newcastle Jets	2017–18	29	1	0	0					29	1
Newcastle Jets	2018–19	27	0	2	1	2	0			31	1
Newcastle Jets	2019–20	26	3	2	0					28	3
Newcastle Jets	2020–21	26	0	0	0					26	0
Newcastle Jets	Total	108	4	4	1	2	0	0	0	114	5
Western United FC	2021–22	21	1	0	0					21	1
Western United FC	2022–23	15	0	0	0					15	0
Western United FC	Total	36	1	0	0	0	0	0	0	36	1
Lambton Jaffas FC	2023	7	1	0	0					7	1
Lambton Jaffas FC	2024	12	0	1	0					13	0
Lambton Jaffas FC	Total	19	1	1	0	0	0	0	0	20	1
Career total		421	13	20	2	23	1	1	0	465	16

== Honours ==
Western Sydney Wanderers

- A-League Premiership: 2012–13
- AFC Champions League: 2014

Individual

- Perth Glory Most Glorious Player Award: 2007–08
- PFA Team of the Season: 2009–10, 2012–13, 2015–16
- A-League All Star: 2013
