= Daniel Alessi =

Australian soccer player (born 1997)

Personal information
- Full name: Daniel Alessander Alessi
- Date of birth: 26 August 1997 (age 29)
- Place of birth: Pymble, New South Wales, Australia
- Height: 1.86 m (6 ft 1 in)
- Position: Defender

Team information
- Current team: Dandenong Thunder
- Number: 3

Youth career
- 2011–2012: NSWIS
- 2012–2013: FNSW NTC
- 2013–2016: Western Sydney Wanderers

Senior career*
Years	Team	Apps	(Gls)
2014–2016	Western Sydney Wanderers	7	(0)
2016	Western Sydney Wanderers NPL	8	(0)
2016–2018	Newcastle Jets	0	(0)
2017–2018	Newcastle Jets NPL	7	(0)
2018	Manly United	19	(0)
2018–2019	ASD Sasso Marconi 1924	30	(0)
2020	Hereford	0	(0)
2020	→ Stratford Town (dual)	6	(0)
2020	Gosport Borough	5	(0)
2020	Blacktown City	2	(0)
2021–2022	Hakoah Sydney City East	41	(2)
2023	St George City	28	(3)
2024–2026	Dandenong Thunder	55	(1)
2026	Green Gully SC	8	(1)

International career^{‡}
2014–2015	Australia U20	17	(0)
- * Club domestic league appearances and goals as of 20 February 2024 ‡ National team caps and goals as of 7 October 2015

Daniel Alessander Alessi (born 26 August 1997) is an Australian footballer who currently plays for Dandenong Thunder, where he plays as a defender.

== Club career ==
=== Western Sydney Wanderers ===
Alessi joined the Western Sydney Wanderers on 13 October 2013 on a Youth League contract for the 2013–14 season. Alessi played his debut game in the senior team in the second Sydney derby of the season on 11 January 2014. He impressed the coach Tony Popovic and was selected for the round's team of the week. In May 2014 Alessi signed a professional contract, keeping him at the club until the end of the 2015–16 season.

=== Newcastle Jets ===
Shortly after being released by the Western Sydney Wanderers, Alessi signed with the Newcastle Jets. On 19 February 2018, after not playing for the club, Alessi was released by Newcastle Jets to allow him to take up an opportunity at Manly United.

On 11 January 2020, Alessi joined Southern League Premier Division Central side Stratford Town, on dual registration from Hereford.

In February 2020, Alessi signed a permanent deal with Gosport Borough.

Alessi returned to Australia, signing with National Premier Leagues club Blacktown City in July 2020.

== International career ==
Alessi was called up to the Australia u-20's training squad in December 2013. In September, Alessi travelled to Vietnam for the 2014 AFF U-19 Youth Championship. Alessi was also selected for the 2014 AFC U-19 Championship in October.

== Career statistics ==
=== Club ===
Club	Season	League			Cup		Asia		Total	
Club	Season	Division	Apps	Goals	Apps	Goals	Apps	Goals	Apps	Goals
Western Sydney Wanderers	2013–14	A-League	3	0	0	0	2	0	5	0
Western Sydney Wanderers	2014–15	A-League	4	0	0	0	1	0	5	0
Western Sydney Wanderers	2015–16	A-League	0	0	1	0	0	0	1	0
Western Sydney Wanderers	Wanderers total		7	0	1	0	3	0	11	0
Western Sydney Wanderers Youth	2016	NPL NSW 2	8	0	0	0	0	0	8	0
Newcastle Jets	2016–17	A-League	0	0	0	0	0	0	0	0
Newcastle Jets	2017–18	A-League	0	0	0	0	0	0	0	0
Newcastle Jets	Jets total		0	0	0	0	0	0	0	0
Career total			15	0	1	0	3	0	19	0

== Honours ==
=== Club ===
Western Sydney Wanderers

- AFC Champions League: 2014
