= Mateo Poljak =

Croatian professional footballer (born 1989)

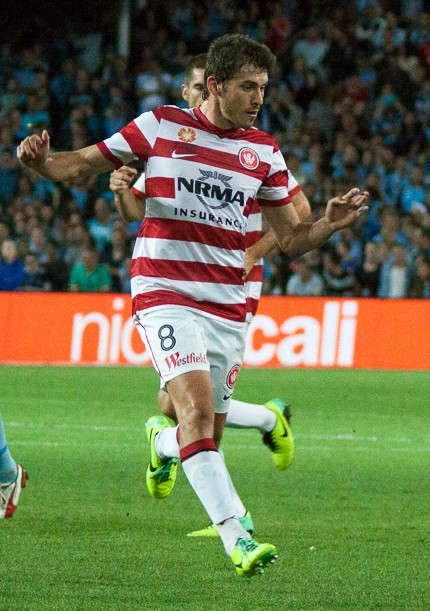
- Poljak with Western Sydney Wanderers in 2013

Personal information
- Full name: Mateo Hrvatsko Poljak
- Date of birth: 10 September 1989 (age 37)
- Place of birth: Zagreb, SR Croatia, SFR Yugoslavia
- Height: 1.82 m (6 ft 0 in)
- Position: Defensive midfielder

Youth career
- 2000–2008: Dinamo Zagreb

Senior career*
Years	Team	Apps	(Gls)
2008–2009	Lokomotiva Zagreb	26	(8)
2010–2012	Dinamo Zagreb	0	(0)
2010–2012	→ Lokomotiva Zagreb (loan)	60	(4)
2012–2015	Western Sydney Wanderers	66	(3)
2015–2017	Newcastle Jets	50	(3)
2017	Astra Giurgiu	3	(0)
2018	Marconi	15	(2)
2019	Sutherland Sharks	18	(1)
2020	Mt Druitt Town Rangers	2	(0)

International career^{‡}
2005–2008	Croatia U19	8	(1)
- * Club domestic league appearances and goals as of 4 December 2020 ‡ National team caps and goals as of 11 September 2009

Mateo Hrvatsko Poljak (Croatian pronunciation: [matěo poʎaːk]; born 10 September 1989) is a Croatian footballer who last played as a defensive midfielder for Mt Druitt Town Rangers.

== Club career ==
=== Croatia ===
After going through the youth ranks of Dinamo Zagreb, Poljak was moved to their feeder team Lokomotiva Zagreb, then playing in the Druga HNL. After a season there he signed a 7-year contract with the club, which was taken over by Dinamo at the beginning of 2010. He spent the next two and a half seasons on loan at Lokomotiva, however, before his contract was terminated in the summer of 2012.

=== Western Sydney Wanderers ===
On 13 August 2012 it was announced that Poljak had signed with the newly formed A-League club Western Sydney Wanderers. He signed an initial two-year contract, set to expire in July 2014. In his first season with Western Sydney, he made 25 appearances, a mainstay of the side's midfield, scoring one goal and helping the Wanderers win the A-League premiership in the club's first season. On 5 September 2013, Poljak signed a two-year extension with the club, the new contract ending mid 2016.

Poljak again in his second season with Western Sydney was a constant starter throughout with his side finishing the league in second position. He was also a part of the side that won the 2014 AFC Champions League, later going on to compete in the 2014 FIFA Club World Cup.

=== Newcastle Jets ===
In 2015, Poljak was not retained by the Wanderers and joined Newcastle United Jets FC.

== Personal life ==
Poljak is married to Katarina, and has a daughter, Mia.

== Career statistics ==
=== Club ===
Appearances and goals by club, season and competition
Club	Season	League			Cup		Continental		Other		Total	
Club	Season	Division	Apps	Goals	Apps	Goals	Apps	Goals	Apps	Goals	Apps	Goals
Lokomotiva Zagreb	2008–09	Druga HNL	26	8	—		—		—		26	8
Lokomotiva Zagreb	2009–10	Prva HNL	13	2	—		—		—		13	2
Lokomotiva Zagreb	2010–11	Prva HNL	23	0	0	0	—		—		23	0
Lokomotiva Zagreb	2011–12	Prva HNL	24	2	—		—		—		24	2
Lokomotiva Zagreb	Total		86	12	0	0	—		—		86	12
Western Sydney Wanderers	2012–13	A-League	25	1	—		—		—		25	1
Western Sydney Wanderers	2013–14	A-League	22	1	—		0	0	—		22	1
Western Sydney Wanderers	2014–15	A-League	19	1	1	0	6 (Note: Appearances in AFC Champions League)	1	2 (Note: Appearances in FIFA Club World Cup)	0	28	2
Western Sydney Wanderers	Total		66	3	1	0	6	1	2	0	75	4
Newcastle Jets	2015–16	A-League	26	2	1	0	—		—		27	2
Newcastle Jets	2016–17	A-League	24	1	0	0	—		—		24	1
Newcastle Jets	Total		50	3	1	0	—		—		51	3
Astra Giurgiu	2017–18	Liga I	3	0	0	0	1 (Note: Appearances in UEFA Europa League)	0	—		4	0
Marconi	2018	NPL NSW	15	2	1	0	—		—		16	2
Sutherland Sharks	2019	NPL NSW	18	1	0	0	—		—		18	1
Mt Druitt Town Rangers	2020	NPL NSW	2	0	0	0	—		—		2	0
Career total			240	21	3	0	7	1	2	0	252	22

== Honours ==
Western Sydney Wanderers

- AFC Champions League: 2014
