= Vítor Saba =

Brazilian footballer

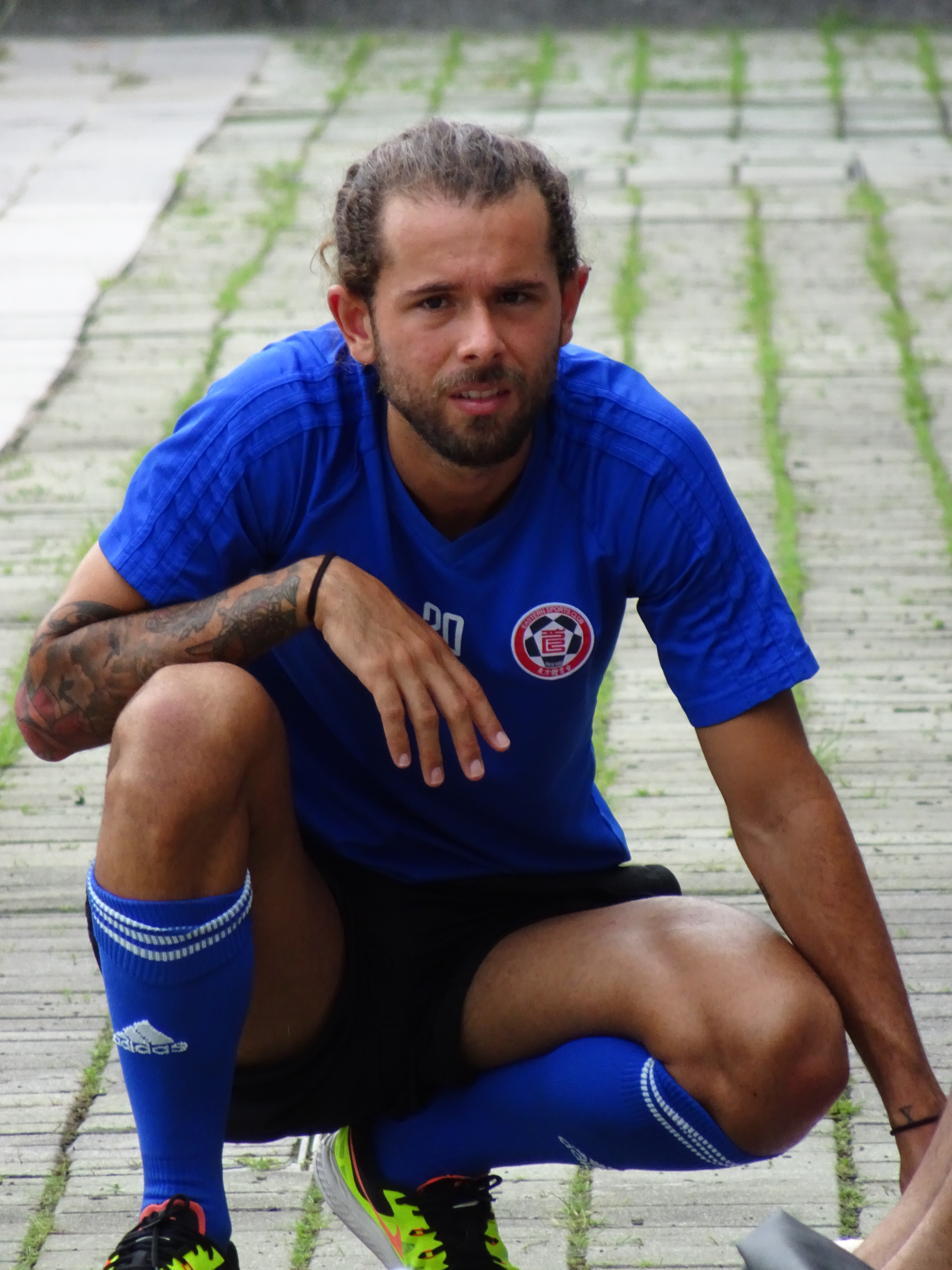
- Saba with Eastern SC in 2017

Personal information
- Full name: Vítor Rodrigues Saba
- Date of birth: 11 July 1990 (age 36)
- Place of birth: Rio de Janeiro, Brazil
- Height: 1.87 m (6 ft 2 in)
- Position: Midfielder

Youth career
- 2001–2006: Vasco da Gama
- 2006–2010: Flamengo

Senior career*
Years	Team	Apps	(Gls)
2010–2012	Flamengo	1	(0)
2011	→ Macaé (loan)	0	(0)
2011–2012	→ Vitória (loan)	1	(0)
2012	→ Boavista (loan)	0	(0)
2012–2014	Brescia	33	(3)
2014–2015	Western Sydney Wanderers	8	(0)
2015	Crotone	0	(0)
2015–2016	AEL Kalloni	12	(0)
2016	Siena	6	(0)
2016–2017	Al-Muharraq		(2)
2017	Fortuna Sittard	5	(0)
2017–2018	Eastern	11	(2)
Total		76	(7)
- * Club domestic league appearances and goals

Vítor Rodrigues Saba (born 11 July 1990) is a former Brazilian professional footballer who played as an attacking midfielder and last played for Hong Kong Premier League team, Eastern SC.

== Club career ==
Born in Brazil, Saba arrived in Vasco da Gama's youth team at the age of 10. In 2007, he joined Flamengo's youth team and was promoted to the professional team in 2010. Saba made his professional debut on 25 September 2010, as a first-half substitute for Juan, playing as left back in a Brazilian Série A 1–3 loss to Palmeiras at Engenhão Stadium. After loans to Brazilian state league sides Macaé, Vitória and Boavista in 2011 and 2012 proved unsuccessful, with Saba failing to make an appearance at either club, he returned to Flamengo. On 14 August 2012, Saba transferred to Italian Serie B club Brescia. During his two-season stint, Saba made 35 appearances (including 2 Coppa Italia matches) and scored 13 goals.

On 20 June 2014, Australian A-League club Western Sydney Wanderers signed Saba on a two-year contract. Saba made his first appearance for the club in the first leg of the 2014 AFC Champions League quarter-final against Chinese club Guangzhou Evergrande, with the player also appearing in the 2014 AFC Champions League Final. In the 2014 FIFA Club World Cup, Saba scored at the 89th minute against ES Sétif of Algeria to level the scoreline 2–2. On January 26, 2015, Saba left Western Sydney Wanderers, later attributing his departure to a poor relationship with the manager, Tony Popovic.

On 2 February 2015, Saba signed with Italian second tier club F.C. Crotone on a free transfer. In June, he received an offer from his old club Botafogo. In February 2016, he switched to the Italian third tier with A.C. Siena after a stint with Greek club AEL Kalloni F.C. After a stint with Bahrani club Al-Muharraq SC(11 games and 2 goals), he joined Eerste Divisie (Dutch second tier) club Fortuna Sittard on a one-year deal on 27 January 2017.

On 4 July 2017, Saba returned to Asia to continue his career by signing with Hong Kong club Eastern SC. On 17 April 2018, Saba confirmed via his Instagram account that he would not return for the following season.

Vitor Saba announced his retirement from football on 26 January 2019 citing heart-related health issues.

== Career statistics ==
Appearances and goals by club, season and competition
Club	Season	League			State league		Cup		Continental		Other		Total	
Club	Season	Division	Apps	Goals	Apps	Goals	Apps	Goals	Apps	Goals	Apps	Goals	Apps	Goals
Flamengo	2010	Série A	1	0	0	0	—		0	0	—		1	0
Macaé (loan)	2011	Série C	—		0	0	—		—		—		0	0
Vitória (loan)	2011	Série B	0	0	1	0	—		—		—		1	0
Boavista (loan)	2012	Carioca	—		0	0	0	0	—		—		0	0
Brescia	2012–13	Serie B	17	2	—		0	0	—		—		17	2
Brescia	2013–14	Serie B	16	1	—		2	0	—		—		18	1
Brescia	Total		33	3	—		2	0	—		—		35	3
Western Sydney Wanderers	2014–15	A-League	8	0	—		0	0	6 (Note: Appearnces in AFC Champions League)	0	1 (Note: Appearances in FIFA Club World Cup)	0	15	0
Crotone	2014–15	Serie B	0	0	—		—		—		—		15	0
AEL Kalloni	2015–16	Super League Greece	12	0	—		0	0	—		—		12	0
Siena	2015–16	Lega Pro	5	0	—		1 (Note: Appearnce in AFC Cup)	0	—		—		6	0
Al-Muharraq	2016–17	Bahrain First Division League		2	—				1	0	—		1	2
Fortuna Sittard	2016–17	Eerste Divisie	5	0	—		—		—		—		5	0
Eastern	2017–18	Hong Kong Premier League	11	2	—		0	0	0	0	4 (Note: Three appearances in Hong Kong Sapling Cup, one appearance in Hong Kong Senior Shield)	0	15	2
Career total			75	7	1	0	3	0	7	0	5	0	91	7

== Honours ==
Western Sydney Wanderers

- AFC Champions League: 2014
