= Liam Youlley =

Australian soccer player (born 1997)

Personal information
- Full name: Liam William Youlley
- Date of birth: 20 February 1997 (age 29)
- Place of birth: Paddington, Australia
- Position: Midfielder

Team information
- Current team: Mounties Wanderers
- Number: 16

Youth career
- 2010–2014: Sydney Olympic
- 2014–2017: Western Sydney Wanderers

Senior career*
Years	Team	Apps	(Gls)
2013	AIS	2	(0)
2015–2017	Western Sydney Wanderers	2	(1)
2016–2017	Western Sydney Wanderers NPL	16	(5)
2017	Sydney Olympic	2	(0)
2017–2018	Maritzburg United	0	(0)
2018–2025	Marconi Stallions	104	(2)
2026–	Mounties Wanderers	21	(4)

International career^{‡}
2014–2016	Australia U-20	16	(1)
Medal record
Men's football
Representing Australia
AFF U-19 Youth Championship
First place	2016 Vietnam	U-20 Team
- * Club domestic league appearances and goals as of 31 August 2026 ‡ National team caps and goals as of 22 October 2016

Liam Youlley (born 20 February 1997) is an Australian professional soccer player who plays as a midfielder for Mounties Wanderers.

== Career ==
Youlley made the bench for the first time for the Western Sydney Wanderers on 25 February 2015 in the AFC Champions League against Kashima Antlers, but did not feature in the match. He made his professional debut for the team in the last game of the A-League season on 25 April 2015 against Perth Glory. He joined Sydney Olympic on 26 May 2017.

In July 2017, Youlley moved to South African Premier Division side Maritzburg United.

== Honours ==
Mounties Wanderers

- (Australia) Football NSW League Two Premiership: 2026

Australia U20

- AFF U-19 Youth Championship: 2016
