= Labinot Haliti =

Soccer player (born 1985)

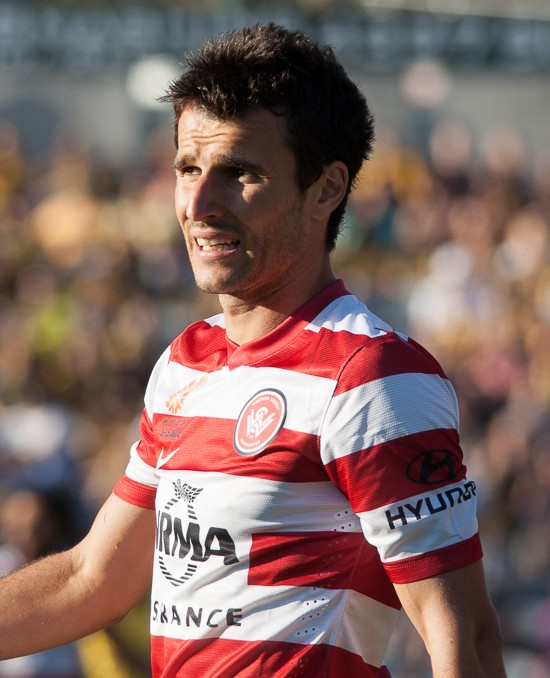
- Haliti with Western Sydney Wanderers in 2013

Personal information
- Full name: Labinot Haliti
- Date of birth: 26 October 1985 (age 41)
- Place of birth: Pristina, SFR Yugoslavia
- Height: 1.84 m (6 ft 0 in)
- Positions: Second striker; winger

Team information
- Current team: Sydney Olympic (head coach)

Youth career
- KF 2 Korriku
- Sydney Olympic

Senior career*
Years	Team	Apps	(Gls)
2002–2003	Sydney Olympic	2	(0)
2003–2005	Sydney United	22	(7)
2005–2007	Newcastle Jets	27	(3)
2007	Slaven Belupo	0	(0)
2007–2008	Teuta	4	(0)
2008–2009	ŁKS Łódź	22	(0)
2009–2012	Newcastle Jets	63	(12)
2012–2015	Western Sydney Wanderers	60	(7)
2015–2017	Newcastle Jets	8	(0)

International career
2006	Australia U23	6	(0)

Managerial career
- 2017–2018: Newcastle Jets Youth (assistant)
- 2018–2019: Newcastle Jets Youth
- 2019–2022: Western Sydney Wanderers (assistant)
- 2023–2025: Sydney Olympic
- * Club domestic league appearances and goals

Labinot Haliti (born 26 October 1985) is a former professional soccer player who played as a second striker or winger. Born in Yugoslavia, he represented Australia at youth level.

== Early life ==
Haliti's was born in Pristina, and fled his homeland due to the Kosovo War at the age of 14 with his family, arriving as refugees in Australia in 1999, where they settled in Sydney.

== Club career ==
Since arriving in Sydney, Haliti stamped himself as a potential superstar of the game with impressive stints at Sydney Olympic and Sydney United in the defunct NSL. Haliti's talent was spotted by the legendary Frank Arok, a former Yugoslav player and coach. It was at Sydney Olympic where Haliti played alongside former Socceroos striker and close friend Ante Milicic, who proved influential in bringing the attacking midfielder to the Newcastle Jets in the newly formed A-League.

=== Newcastle Jets ===
Haliti's impressive first season with the Jets led to much speculation about his international future, with the Albania national team and Australia U23 national team courting his services. A change in manager in his second season at Newcastle saw his opportunities decrease, and Haliti returned to Sydney United in the NSW Premier League. In June 2007, he signed for Croatian Prva HNL team NK Slaven Belupo, however, he failed to make an appearance for the club after signing for KS Teuta Durrës in the Albanian first division a month later. After a string of appearances and 3 goals, he signed for Polish Orange Ekstraklasa team Łódzki KS, where he established himself as a first team squad member.

On 26 August 2009, he was signed to a short-term deal for the Newcastle Jets as an injury replacement for Marko Jesic. On 2 October 2009, Haliti extended his contract with the Jets to a two-year deal. On 3 September 2009, Haliti was included in the squad against Melbourne Victory after a late clearance from his Polish side ŁKS Łódź and the Polish Football Association. He scored with a header in the 87th minute to secure a 1–1 draw for the Jets. During the 2011–12 A-League season, Labinot continued to be an integral part of the Newcastle Jets team and was a fans favourite.

=== Western Sydney Wanderers ===
On 2 July 2012, Haliti joined A-League expansion club Western Sydney Wanderers FC on a free transfer.

Haliti played his first game for the new club on 6 October 2012 and it was Western Sydney Wanderers's first competitive match of any kind against reigning A-League Premiers Central Coast Mariners in the first round of the league. On 2 February, Haliti scored a historic goal against Central Coast Mariners in a top of the table clash in front of a packed house at Central Coast Stadium. Wanderers went on to claim the Premiership Plate.

During the AFC Champions League campaign, Haliti was a key member of the squad playing all 14 games to the Final and ultimately winning the 2014 AFC Champions League trophy against Al-Hilal of Saudi Arabia. They became the first Australian team to be crowned Asian Champions, an achievement they reached in only their first attempt in the Asian tournament. Haliti is also the first Albanian to ever win the ACL.

In the 2014 FIFA Club World Cup in Morocco, Haliti captained his side Wanderers for the first time against ES Sétif.

=== Return to Newcastle Jets ===
On 22 July 2015, Haliti signed a two-year deal with Newcastle Jets, back to the club where he started his A-League career. On 21 October 2015 It was confirmed that Haliti would miss the remainder of the season after suffering an ACL injury in the defeat to Sydney FC.

== International career ==
Haliti holds Albanian and Australian passports, making him eligible to represent Albania and Australia.

== Coaching career ==
While still recovering Haliti announced that he had begun studying for his coaching badges. Haliti retired at the end of the 2017–18 A-League season, having already taken up a position as Assistant Coach of the Newcastle Jets FC Reserves, serving under Jets CEO and head youth coach Lawrie McKinna.

On 8 May 2019, it was announced that Haliti signed with the Western Sydney Wanderers as an assistant coach ahead of the 2019–20 A-League season.

In 2022, Haliti was appointed head coach of Sydney Olympic FC for NPL NSW 2023 season. On 18th November 2025, Haliti stepped down as Sydney Olympic head coach.
