= Yianni Perkatis =

Australian soccer player

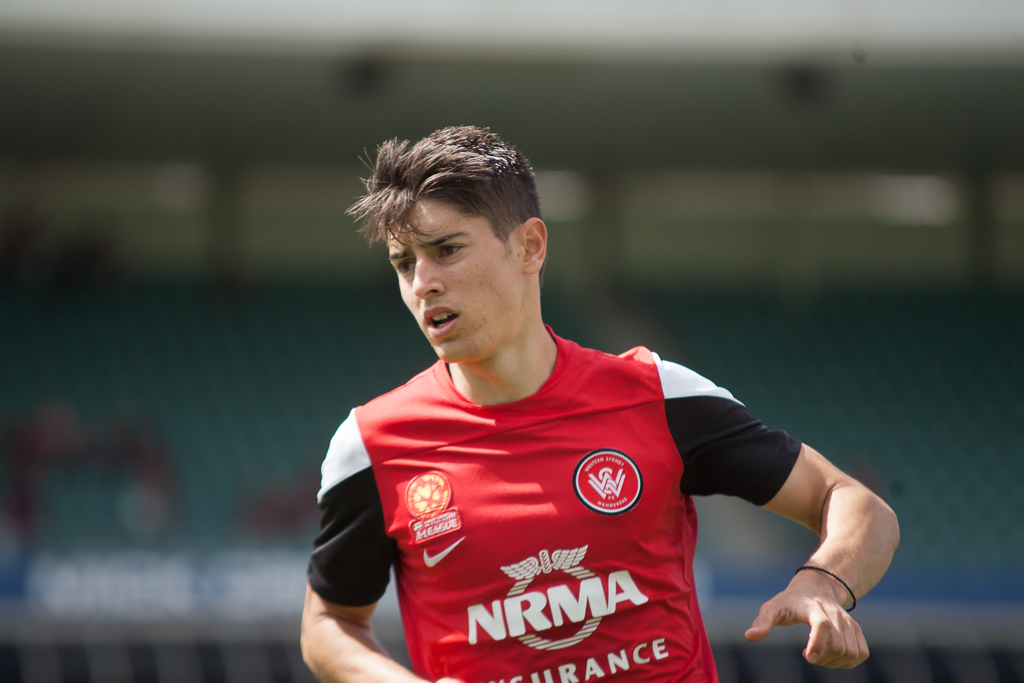
- Perkatis training with Western Sydney Wanderers 2013

Personal information
- Full name: Yianni Jonathan Perkatis
- Date of birth: 8 March 1994 (age 32)
- Place of birth: Baulkham Hills, New South Wales, Australia
- Height: 1.83 m (6 ft 0 in)
- Position: Central midfielder

Team information
- Current team: Granville Rage
- Number: 16

Youth career
- 2010–2012: AIS
- 2012–2013: Western Sydney Wanderers

Senior career*
Years	Team	Apps	(Gls)
2012	Blacktown City	1	(0)
2013–2015	Western Sydney Wanderers	8	(0)
2015	Blacktown City	12	(0)
2016	Blacktown Spartans	18	(1)
2016–2017	Ethnikos Assia	3	(1)
2017	Global FC	0	(0)
2017–2020	Sydney United 58	57	(1)
2020	Perth Glory	0	(0)
2020–2023	Sydney United 58	62	(1)
2024	South Coast Flame	21	(3)
2025	Mounties Wanderers	11	(0)
2025–	Granville Rage	24	(1)

International career^{‡}
2010–2011	Australia U17	11	(1)
2012	Australia U20	2	(0)
- * Club domestic league appearances and goals as of 21 June 2026 ‡ National team caps and goals as of 13 May 2015

Yianni Perkatis (born 8 March 1994) is an Australian soccer player who plays as a central midfielder for Granville Rage in NSW League Two.

== Club career ==
In 2012, he made one appearance for National Premier Leagues NSW side Blacktown City.

On 29 March 2013 Perkatis made his A-League debut for Western Sydney Wanderers against the Newcastle Jets.

On 13 May 2015 Perkatis was released from his contract with Western Sydney two weeks early to allow him to join Blacktown City.

In June 2016, Perkatis joined Cypriot Second Division side Ethnikos Assia FC on a free transfer. After impressing with his limited opportunities in Cyprus, he was forced to depart the club over unpaid wages on the duration of his contract.

In January 2017, Perkatis joined Global FC as AFC Champions League qualifications loomed. However the club did not qualify and substantially released all their foreign players due to financial restrictions.

In March 2017, Perkatis joined National Premier Leagues NSW side Sydney United, establishing himself as one of the key midfielders for the club.

In July 2020, Perkatis returned to the A-League, joining Perth Glory on a short-term league until the end of the season. He rejoined Sydney United at the end of the 2019–20 A-League.

== Honours ==
=== Club ===
Western Sydney Wanderers

- AFC Champions League: 2014

Sydney United:

- (Australia) National Premier Leagues NSW Championship: 2020
- (Australia) Waratah Cup Champions: 2023
