= Jaushua Sotirio =

New Caledonian footballer (born 1995)

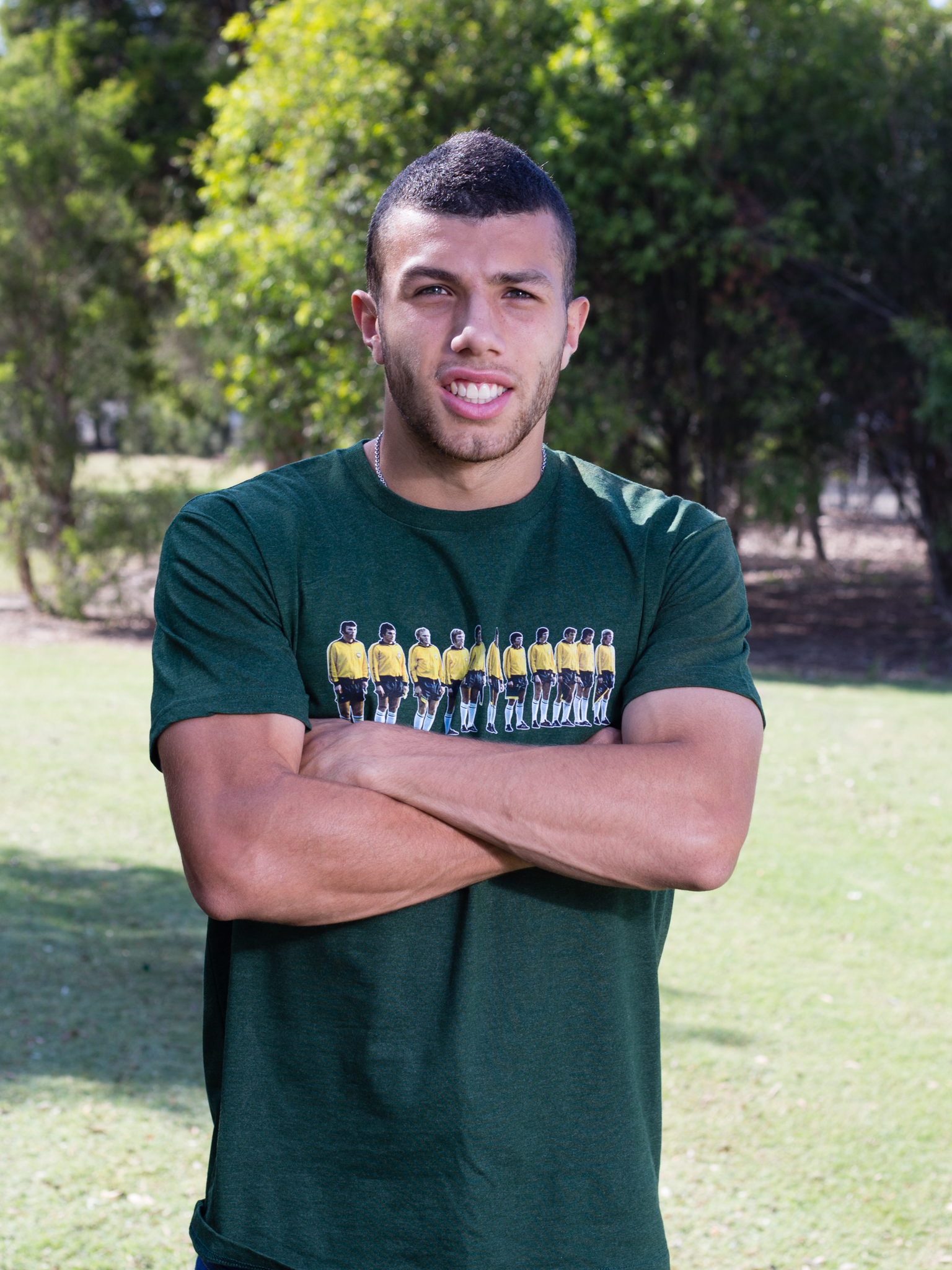
- Sotirio in 2015

Personal information
- Full name: Jaushua James Elie Sotirio
- Date of birth: 11 October 1995 (age 31)
- Place of birth: Sydney, Australia
- Height: 1.75 m (5 ft 9 in)
- Positions: Striker; winger

Youth career
- FC Five Dock
- APIA Leichhardt
- –2013: Marconi Stallions
- 2013: Western Sydney Wanderers

Senior career*
Years	Team	Apps	(Gls)
2013	Marconi Stallions	4	(1)
2013–2019	Western Sydney Wanderers	81	(11)
2019–2022	Wellington Phoenix	65	(14)
2022–2023	Newcastle Jets	23	(3)
2023–2025	Kerala Blasters	0	(0)
2025	Sydney FC	2	(0)
2026	Hougang United	14	(5)

International career^{‡}
2014	Australia U20	7	(1)
2014–2017	Australia U23	6	(3)
- * Club domestic league appearances and goals as of 19 March 2026 ‡ National team caps and goals as of 24 March 2025

Jaushua James Elie Sotirio (born 11 October 1995), better known as Josh Sotirio, is a professional footballer who plays either as a striker or winger most recently for Singapore Premier League club Hougang United. Born in Australia, he plays for the New Caledonia national team.

== Club career ==
=== Western Sydney Wanderers ===
Sotirio began his professional career at Western Sydney Wanderers, and made his league debut on 14 December 2013 at Hunter Stadium against Newcastle Jets. His starting debut came on 15 November 2014 against Perth Glory, where he also scored in the 2–1 defeat.

Sotirio spent 6 seasons at the Wanderers, making a total of 81 league appearances for the club, before departing at the end of the 2018–19 season.

=== Wellington Phoenix ===
Following his departure from Western Sydney, Sotirio joined Wellington Phoenix.

Sotirio spent 3 seasons at Wellington Phoenix, making 65 league appearances, before leaving after the 2021–22 season.

=== Newcastle Jets ===
Sotirio's next move was to the Newcastle Jets for the 2022–23 season. Sotirio spent just one season at the club before departing in May 2023.

=== Kerala Blasters ===
Immediately after his release from Newcastle was announced, it was announced in May 2023 that Sotirio had joined Indian Super League club Kerala Blasters on a two-year deal. The Blasters also paid an undisclosed amount of transfer fee to sign Sotirio. On 19 July 2023, Kerala Blasters announced that Sotirio suffered an ankle injury on his right leg during a training session and would remain out of action until at least 2024. He ruptured his achilles tendon, which required surgery.

== International career ==
On 10 March 2025, Sotirio's request to switch allegiance to New Caledonia was approved by FIFA. The following week he was called-up to the squad for the Oceanian 2026 FIFA World Cup qualification semi-final.

== Personal life ==
Sotirio has dual citizenship (French and Australian); both of his parents are from New Caledonia. He is Caldoche, being of French and Italian descent and speaking French natively.
