= Alusine Fofanah (soccer) =

Soccer player (born 1997)

Personal information
- Full name: Alusine Bakish Fofanah
- Date of birth: 21 November 1997 (age 28)
- Place of birth: Freetown, Sierra Leone
- Height: 1.67 m (5 ft 6 in)
- Position: Attacking midfielder

Team information
- Current team: Mt Druitt Town Rangers

Youth career
- 2013: Bankstown Berries
- 2013–2016: Western Sydney Wanderers

Senior career*
Years	Team	Apps	(Gls)
2014–2016	Western Sydney Wanderers	5	(0)
2016	Western Sydney Wanderers NPL	7	(2)
2017	Sydney FC NPL	5	(1)
2017	Heidelberg United	5	(0)
2018–2019	Rydalmere Lions	19	(3)
2019	Parramatta FC	6	(1)
2020	Adelaide Blue Eagles	1	(0)
2021–	Mt Druitt Town Rangers	0	(0)

International career^{‡}
2015	Australia U20	8	(3)
- * Club domestic league appearances and goals as of 4 November 2020 ‡ National team caps and goals as of 7 October 2015

Alusine Bakish Fofanah (born 21 November 1997) is a soccer player who plays as an attacking midfielder for Mt Druitt Town Rangers. He is the youngest ever player in the history of the A-League, making his debut for the Western Sydney Wanderers at just 15 years and 189 days. Born in Sierra Leone, he represented Australia at youth level.

== Club career ==
At the age of 14, Fofanah had a successful trial with Manchester City, scoring six goals in two matches with the under-18 squad. However, due to difficulties with passports and visas he did not join the club.

In 2013, he played for Bankstown Berries in the National Premier League's NSW under 18 competition before joining Western Sydney Wanderers' youth set-up. He went on to sign a two-year senior contract with Western Sydney Wanderers in May 2014, and in making his debut at just 15 years and 189 days old, became the youngest player in A-League history. He was described as being "very agile, with quick feet, a high work rate and a desperate desire to succeed" by Wanderers' academy coach Trevor Morgan. Fofanah was part of the squad that won the 2014 Asian Champions League and participated in the 2014 FIFA Club World Cup in Morocco. He spent two seasons at the Wanderers, making seven appearances in all competitions and was released in June 2016.

In 2016, Fofanah joined Sydney FC's NPL squad, followed up by a season with former Victorian champions Heidelberg United in which he played five matches. In 2018, Fofanah joined Rydalmere Lions and even played with them against his former club, Western Sydney Wanderers' NPL side. He scored 3 goals in 19 matches for the club. In May 2019, he joined Parramatta FC for the remainder of the season, scoring 1 goal in 6 matches during his time at the club. In 2020, Fofanah joined South Australian club Adelaide Blue Eagles.

In January 2021, Fofanah join National Premier League NSW club, Mt Druitt Town Rangers. However, he left the club in a mutual agreement in February 2021.

== Personal life ==
Fofanah was born in Sierra Leone and at a young age immigrated with his parents to Australia. He grew up for almost three years with his grandparents. Fofanah started following football at the age of six and has revealed that he was inspired by Cristiano Ronaldo at the 2006 World Cup semi-final between Portugal and France.

== Honours ==
Western Sydney Wanderers

- AFC Champions League: 2014
