= A-League transfers for 2012–13 season =

This is a list of the transfers for the 2012–13 A-League season. This list includes transfers featuring at least one A-League club. Promotions from youth squads to the first squad of the same club are not included.

† Brackets around club names indicate the player's contract with that club had expired making him a Free agent before he signed for a new club.

Date	Name	Moving from	Moving to
17 January 2012	(Australia) Mark Birighitti	Adelaide United	Newcastle Jets
21 January 2012	(Australia) Andrew Redmayne	Brisbane Roar	Melbourne Heart
17 February 2012	(Australia) James Brown	Gold Coast United	Newcastle Jets
2 March 2012	(Australia) Adam Taggart	Perth Glory	Newcastle Jets
15 March 2012	(Ivory Coast) Adama Traoré	Gold Coast United	Melbourne Victory
16 March 2012	(Australia) Sam Gallagher	Central Coast Mariners	Melbourne Victory
22 March 2012	(Australia) Daniel Bowles	Gold Coast United	Adelaide United
28 March 2012	(New Zealand) Glen Moss	Gold Coast United	Wellington Phoenix
28 March 2012	(Ukraine) Yevhen Levchenko	Adelaide United	Unattached
6 April 2012	(Australia) Jake Barker-Daish	Gold Coast United	Adelaide United
27 April 2012	(Australia) Nick Ward	Wellington Phoenix	Perth Glory
30 April 2012	(Australia) Chris Harold	Gold Coast United	Perth Glory
30 April 2012	(Australia) Adrian Zahra	Melbourne Heart	Perth Glory
7 May 2012	(Australia) Craig Goodwin	Melbourne Heart	Newcastle Jets
7 May 2012	(Australia) Scott Neville	Perth Glory	Newcastle Jets
11 May 2012	(Australia) Joshua Brillante	Gold Coast United	Newcastle Jets
13 May 2012	(Australia) Ben Halloran	Gold Coast United	Brisbane Roar
14 May 2012	(New Zealand) Jeremy Brockie	Newcastle Jets	Wellington Phoenix
15 May 2012	(Australia) Zachary Anderson	Gold Coast United	Central Coast Mariners
17 May 2012	(Australia) Scott Jamieson	Sydney FC	Perth Glory
18 May 2012	(Australia) Michael Thwaite	Gold Coast United	Perth Glory
21 May 2012	(Iraq) Ali Abbas	Newcastle Jets	Sydney FC
24 May 2012	(Brazil) Fabio	Melbourne Victory	Sydney FC
25 May 2012	(Australia) Mitch Cooper	Gold Coast United	Newcastle Jets
4 June 2012	(Australia) Adam Griffiths	(China) Hangzhou Greentown	Sydney FC
7 June 2012	(Australia) Eli Babalj	Melbourne Heart	(Serbia) Red Star Belgrade
14 June 2012	(Australia) Spase Dilevski	Adelaide United	Melbourne Victory
18 June 2012	(Australia) Vedran Janjetović	(Australia) Sydney United	Sydney FC
19 June 2012	(Solomon Islands) Benjamin Totori	(Solomon Islands) Koloale FC	Wellington Phoenix
20 June 2012	(Mauritius) Jonathan Bru	(Portugal) Moreirense FC	Melbourne Victory
22 June 2012	(Brazil) Guilherme Finkler	(Brazil) Criciúma	Melbourne Victory
24 June 2012	(Australia) Harry Kewell	Melbourne Victory	Unattached
25 June 2012	(Australia) Aaron Mooy	(Scotland) St Mirren	Western Sydney Wanderers
25 June 2012	(Australia) Tarek Elrich	Newcastle Jets	Western Sydney Wanderers
25 June 2012	(New Zealand) Kwabena Appiah-Kubi	(Australia) Parramatta FC	Western Sydney Wanderers
27 June 2012	(Liberia) Patrick Gerhardt	(Bosnia and Herzegovina) FK Željezničar Sarajevo	Melbourne Heart
28 June 2012	(Australia) Josh Mitchell	Perth Glory	Newcastle Jets
30 June 2012	(Australia) Michael Beauchamp	Sydney FC	Western Sydney Wanderers
30 June 2012	(Australia) Mark Bridge	Sydney FC	Western Sydney Wanderers
30 June 2012	(Australia) Shannon Cole	Sydney FC	Western Sydney Wanderers
30 June 2012	(Australia) Nikolai Topor-Stanley	Newcastle Jets	Western Sydney Wanderers
2 July 2012	(Australia) Ante Covic	Melbourne Victory	Western Sydney Wanderers
2 July 2012	(Australia) Labinot Haliti	Newcastle Jets	Western Sydney Wanderers
2 July 2012	(Australia) Golgol Mebrahtu	Gold Coast United	Melbourne Heart
2 July 2012	(Republic of Ireland) Steven Gray	(Australia) Oakleigh Cannons	Melbourne Heart
2 July 2012	(Australia) Daniel Mullen	Adelaide United	(China) Dalian Aerbin
2 July 2012	(Australia) Theo Markelis	(Italy) Vicenza	Melbourne Victory
2 July 2012	(Switzerland) Dominik Ritter	(Switzerland) FC Winterthur	Newcastle Jets
4 July 2012	(Argentina) Marco Flores	(China) Henan Jianye	Melbourne Victory
5 July 2012	(Croatia) Krunoslav Lovrek	(China) Qingdao Jonoon	Sydney FC
9 July 2012	(Australia) Mile Sterjovski	(China) Dalian Aerbin	Central Coast Mariners
11 July 2012	(Panama) Yairo Yau	(Panama) Sporting San Miguelito	Sydney FC
11 July 2012	(Australia) Mark Milligan	(Japan) JEF United Chiba	Melbourne Victory
14 July 2012	(Croatia) Josip Tadić	(Poland) Lechia Gdańsk	Melbourne Heart
16 July 2012	(New Zealand) Michael Boxall	(Canada) Vancouver Whitecaps	Wellington Phoenix
16 July 2012	(Australia) Brendan Hamill	Melbourne Heart	(South Korea) Seongnam Ilhwa Chunma
17 July 2012	(South Korea) Do Dong-Hyun	Free Agent	Brisbane Roar
18 July 2012	(Australia) Alex Wilkinson	Central Coast Mariners	(South Korea) Jeonbuk Motors
23 July 2012	(Australia) Dylan Macallister	Gold Coast United	Melbourne Heart
24 July 2012	(Australia) David Vranković	(Australia) Bonnyrigg White Eagles	Melbourne Heart
30 July 2012	(Australia) Brent Griffiths	Wellington Phoenix	Central Coast Mariners
31 July 2012	(Australia) Adam D'Apuzzo	(Australia) APIA Leichhardt Tigers	Western Sydney Wanderers
1 August 2012	(Australia) Curtis Good	Melbourne Heart	(England) Newcastle United
2 August 2012	(Australia) Jerrad Tyson	Gold Coast United	Western Sydney Wanderers
2 August 2012	(Australia) Jason Trifiro	(Australia) South Melbourne FC	Western Sydney Wanderers
2 August 2012	(Australia) Reece Caira	(England) Aston Villa	Western Sydney Wanderers
3 August 2012	(Argentina) Marcelo Carrusca	(Argentina) San Martín de San Juan	Adelaide United
6 August 2012	(Australia) Kofi Danning	Brisbane Roar	(Belgium) CS Visé
6 August 2012	(Brazil) Bernardo Ribeiro	(Albania) KF Skënderbeu Korçë	Newcastle Jets
8 August 2012	(Australia) Tahj Minniecon	Gold Coast United	Western Sydney Wanderers
10 August 2012	(Australia) Trent McClenahan	Central Coast Mariners	Sydney FC
10 August 2012	(Argentina) Jerónimo Morales Neumann	(Argentina) Independiente Rivadavia	Adelaide United
13 August 2012	(Croatia) Dino Kresinger	(Croatia) HNK Cibalia	Western Sydney Wanderers
13 August 2012	(Croatia) Mateo Poljak	(Croatia) Dinamo Zagreb	Western Sydney Wanderers
21 August 2012	(Germany) Jérome Polenz	(Germany) 1. FC Union Berlin	Western Sydney Wanderers
23 August 2012	(Australia) Richard Garcia	(England) Hull City	Melbourne Heart
27 August 2012	(Portugal) Fábio Ferreira	Dulwich Hill	Adelaide United
27 August 2012	(Australia) Nick Carle	Sydney FC	(United Arab Emirates) Baniyas SC (12-month loan)
30 August 2012	(Japan) Yuji Takahashi	(Japan) Kyoto Sanga FC	Brisbane Roar (loan)
1 September 2012	(Scotland) Nick Montgomery	(England) Sheffield United	Central Coast Mariners
5 September 2012	(Italy) Alessandro Del Piero	(Italy) Juventus	Sydney FC
11 September 2012	(Italy) Iacopo La Rocca	(Switzerland) Grasshopper Club Zürich	Western Sydney Wanderers
11 September 2012	(Netherlands) Youssouf Hersi	(Cyprus) Alki Larnaca	Western Sydney Wanderers
14 September 2012	(Belgium) Stein Huysegems	(Belgium) Lierse SK	Wellington Phoenix
17 September 2012	(New Zealand) Tyler Boyd	(New Zealand) Waikato FC	Wellington Phoenix
19 September 2012	(New Zealand) Louis Fenton	(New Zealand) Team Wellington	Wellington Phoenix
19 September 2012	(Australia) Ben Garuccio	(Australia) AIS	Melbourne Heart
21 September 2012	(England) Emile Heskey	(England) Aston Villa	Newcastle Jets
22 September 2012	(Australia) Paul Reid	(Thailand) Insee Police United	Sydney FC
22 September 2012	(Panama) Ricardo Clarke	(Panama) Sporting San Miguelito	Wellington Phoenix (loan)
28 September 2012	(Japan) Shinji Ono	(Japan) Shimizu S-Pulse	Western Sydney Wanderers
28 September 2012	(Japan) Ryo Nagai	(Japan) Cerezo Osaka	Perth Glory (loan)
30 September 2012	(Australia) Kearyn Baccus	(France) Le Mans FC	Perth Glory
3 October 2012	(Australia) Joey Gibbs	Central Coast Mariners	Western Sydney Wanderers
12 October 2012	(Australia) Jason Culina	Newcastle Jets	Sydney FC
16 October 2012	(Australia) Vince Grella	(England) Blackburn Rovers	Melbourne Heart
19 October 2012	(Australia) Lewis Italiano	(Australia) Oakleigh Cannons	Perth Glory
24 October 2012	(Australia) Nathan Coe	(Denmark) SønderjyskE	Melbourne Victory
29 October 2012	(Australia) Matthew Nash	(Australia) Parramatta FC	Newcastle Jets
21 November 2012	(Australia) Chris Grossman	(Australia) Moreland Zebras	Newcastle Jets
22 November 2012	(North Macedonia) Aleks Vrteski	(Indonesia) Persija Jakarta (IPL)	Newcastle Jets (loan)
29 November 2012	(Australia) Jason Geria	Brisbane Roar	Melbourne Victory
30 November 2012	(Australia) Griffin McMaster	(Australia) Bentleigh Greens	Wellington Phoenix
27 December 2012	(Australia) Matthew Nash	(Australia) Parramatta FC	Sydney FC
31 December 2012	(Australia) Cameron Edwards	(England) Nike Football Academy	Melbourne Heart
4 January 2013	(Republic of Ireland) Billy Mehmet	Perth Glory	(Thailand) Bangkok Glass
7 January 2013	(New Zealand) Ian Hogg	(United States) Portland Timbers	Wellington Phoenix
8 January 2013	(Australia) Jade North	(Japan) Consadole Sapporo	Brisbane Roar
9 January 2013	(Australia) Michael Marrone	Melbourne Heart	(China) Shanghai Shenxin
9 January 2013	(Australia) Julius Davies	Melbourne Victory	Brisbane Roar
9 January 2013	(Australia) Rocky Visconte	Brisbane Roar	Western Sydney Wanderers
14 January 2013	(Australia) Nicholas Fitzgerald	Brisbane Roar	Central Coast Mariners
14 January 2013	(Australia) Joel Griffiths	(China) Shanghai Shenhua	Sydney FC
15 January 2013	(Australia) Erik Paartalu	Brisbane Roar	(China) Tianjin Teda
17 January 2013	(Brazil) Tiago Calvano	Newcastle Jets	Sydney FC
17 January 2013	(Netherlands) Sergio van Dijk	Adelaide United	(Indonesia) Persib Bandung
17 January 2013	(Australia) Francesco Stella	(Scotland) Rangers F.C.	Melbourne Victory
18 January 2013	(Australia) Tom Rogic	Central Coast Mariners	(Scotland) Celtic F.C.
18 January 2013	(Australia) Jesse Makarounas	Perth Glory	Melbourne Victory
20 January 2013	(Australia) Scott Galloway	(Australia) AIS	Melbourne Victory
23 January 2013	(Australia) Zenon Caravella	Adelaide United	Newcastle Jets
23 January 2013	(Australia) Nicholas Fitzgerald	Brisbane Roar	Central Coast Mariners
24 January 2013	(Australia) Eli Babalj	(Serbia) Red Star Belgrade	Melbourne Heart
24 January 2013	(Australia) Isaka Cernak	Melbourne Victory	Wellington Phoenix
26 January 2013	(Australia) Steven Lustica	(Croatia) HNK Hajduk Split	Brisbane Roar (loan)
29 January 2013	(Australia) Aziz Behich	Melbourne Heart	(Turkey) Bursaspor
29 January 2013	(Netherlands) Stef Nijland	(Netherlands) PSV Eindhoven	Brisbane Roar (loan)
6 February 2013	(Australia) Jamie Coyne	(Indonesia) Sriwijaya	Melbourne Heart
6 February 2013	(Argentina) Matías Córdoba	(Chile) Deportes La Serena	Perth Glory
9 February 2013	(Australia) Corey Gameiro	(England) Fulham	Wellington Phoenix (loan)
10 February 2013	(Australia) Tomi Juric	(Croatia) NK Inter Zaprešić	Adelaide United
11 February 2013	(Australia) Daniel Mullen	(China) Dalian Aerbin	Melbourne Victory (loan)
12 February 2013	(Netherlands) Marcel Meeuwis	(Netherlands) VVV-Venlo	Melbourne Heart
13 February 2013	(Australia) Jarrod Kyle	(England) Sheffield Wednesday	Sydney FC
16 February 2013	(Australia) Lucas Neill	(United Arab Emirates) Al Wasl	Sydney FC
26 February 2013	(Australia) Ryan Griffiths	Newcastle Jets	(China) Beijing Baxy
7 March 2013	(Australia) Josh Barresi	(Australia) AIS	Western Sydney Wanderers

- ^1 Injury replacement contract
- ^2 Player will officially join his club on 14 January 2013

== See also ==
For transfers related to next season see: A-League transfers for 2013–14 season
