= 2012–13 Western Sydney Wanderers FC season =

Western Sydney Wanderers
2012–13 season
- Chairman: Lyall Gorman
- Manager: Tony Popovic
- Stadium: Parramatta Stadium
- A-League: Premiers
- A-League Finals series: Runners-up
- Top goalscorer: League: Mark Bridge (11); All: Mark Bridge (11)
- Highest home attendance: 19,585 vs Sydney FC (23 March 2013)
- Lowest home attendance: 6,755 vs Brisbane Roar (9 December 2012)
Home colours	Away colours

The 2012–13 Western Sydney Wanderers FC season was the club's inaugural season since its establishment in 2012. The club participated in the A-League for the first time, winning the competition and finishing as runner-up in the 2013 A-League Grand Final.

== Season overview ==
On 4 April 2012, Western Sydney Wanderers was established by FFA as a Western Sydney based club to compete in the A-League. On 17 May, Tony Popovic was announced as inaugural head coach. Popovic joined the club on a four-year deal after requesting to be released from the final year of his contracted role as assistant manager of Crystal Palace. On 22 May, Ante Milicic joined the club as assistant coach. On 25 June, the first players to sign to the new club were announced, these were Aaron Mooy from St Mirren, Tarek Elrich from Newcastle Jets and Kwabena Appiah-Kubi from Central Coast Mariners. All three players signed a one-year contract, as would all players in the inaugural squad, with exception of two (Beauchamp and Ono). On 30 June, Sydney players Michael Beauchamp, Mark Bridge and Shannon Cole, as well as Nikolai Topor-Stanley from Newcastle Jets FC all signed for the club. Beauchamp was the first player to sign past the inaugural season, with a three-year contract. On 2 July, Ante Čović joined the squad from Melbourne Victory and Labinot Haliti joined from Newcastle Jets. On 25 July, after just two months of developing a squad, the club played its first friendly match against local club, Nepean. The game ended in a 0–5 win for Wanderers, with Haliti scoring one and Gibbs scoring four in front of a crowd of 3,500. On 31 July, Adam D'Apuzzo signed to the new club from APIA Leichhardt Tigers. On 2 August, Jerrad Tyson joined the squad from Gold Coast United, Jason Trifiro joined the squad from South Melbourne and Reece Caira joined from Aston Villa. On 8 August, Tahj Minniecon joined the squad from Gold Coast United. On 13 August, Dino Kresinger joined the squad from Cibalia and Mateo Poljak joined from Dinamo Zagreb. On 21 August, Jérome Polenz joined the squad from Union Berlin. On 11 September, Iacopo La Rocca joined the squad from Grasshoppers and Youssouf Hersi joined from Alki Larnaca. On 28 September, Japanese midfielder Shinji Ono became the club's International Marquee player, signing to the club for two years from J. League Division 1 team Shimizu S-Pulse. On 3 October, Joey Gibbs joined the squad from Marconi Stallions FC.

On 6 October, Western Sydney Wanderers played their first competitive match of any kind against Central Coast Mariners in the first round of the A-League season. The match, played in front of a home crowd, ended in a 0–0 draw. On 12 October, Wanderers lost to Adelaide United by a score of 1–0. On 20 October, Wanderers lost to Sydney by a score of 0–1 in front of a sell out crowd in the first ever Sydney Derby match. On 22 October, Wanderers defeated Brisbane Roar 0–1 with Bridge scoring to secure the team's first competitive win of any kind. On 2 November, Wanderers defeated Melbourne Heart 2–1 at home with a goal from Bridge and an own goal from Gerhardt. On 10 November, Wanderers lost to Newcastle Jets by a score of 1–2 with Gibbs providing the only goal. On 18 November, a 10-manned Wanderers defeated Perth Glory 0–1 with Hersi sent off on the 38th minute after a goal scored by La Rocca. On 24 November, Wanderers lost to Melbourne Victory by a score of 0–2. On 2 December, Wanderers lost to Wellington Phoenix by a score of 1–0. On 9 December, Wanderers defeated Brisbane Roar 1–0 with a goal by Ono. On 15 December, Wanderers defeated Sydney 0–2 in the second Sydney Derby match of the season, with goals from Hersi and Beauchamp. On 21 December, Wanderers defeated Adelaide United 6–1 with a hat-trick from Bridge, as well as goals from Kresinger, Ono and Gibbs. On 27 December, Wanderers drew against Perth Glory 1–1 with a goal by Haliti.

On 1 January 2013, Wanderers defeated Melbourne Victory 2–1 with Ono scoring both goals. The result saw Wanderers overtake Melbourne Victory for third place in the league. On 3 January, defenders Adam D’Apuzzo and Shannon Cole extended their contracts with the club for a further one year until 2014. On 6 January, a ten manned Wanderers lost to Central Coast Mariners by a score 0–2 with Trifiro sent off early in the second half. On 9 January, Rocky Visconte signed a short-term contract with the club until the end of the season. On 13 January, Wanderers bounced back with a 0–2 win over Wellington Phoenix with Topor-Stanley and Haliti scoring. On 20 January, Wanderers continued their winning ways, defeating Brisbane Roar 1–2 with goals from Bridge and Hersi. On 26 January, Wanderers defeated Melbourne Heart 1–0 with a goal by Ono after Polenz was sent off early in the first half. On 3 February, Wanderers defeated Adelaide United 2–4 with goals from Hersi and one each from Bridge and Poljak. On 9 February, Wanderers defeated Newcastle Jets 2–1 with two goals from Hersi and Bridge. The win took Wanderers to second place in the league. On 16 February, Wanderers defeated Melbourne Victory 1–2 with goals from La Rocca and Ono. On 23 February, Wanderers defeated Perth Glory 1–0 with a goal by Mooy. On 2 March, Wanderers defeated Central Coast Mariners 0–1 with a goal by Haliti. The win saw Wanderers overtake Central Coast Mariners for first place in the league. On 7 March, Josh Barresi signed to the club on a two-year first team professional contract as an injury replacement for Tahj Minniecon. On 10 March, Wanderers defeated Wellington Phoenix 2–1 with Ono and Bridge both scoring penalty kicks to set an A-League record of nine straight match wins. On 16 March, Wanderers defeated Melbourne Heart 1–3 with two goals from Haliti and one from La Rocca. On 22 March, goalkeeper Carlos Saliadarre signed a short-term contract with Wanderers from Blacktown Spartans until the end of the season as an injury replacement for Jerrad Tyson. On 23 March, Wanderers broke their 10-game winning streak after a 1–1 draw against Sydney in the third Sydney Derby match of the season in front of a sold out crowd. Cole scored Wanderers only goal shortly after Sydney received a red card, with La Rocca also receiving a red card later in the game. On 29 March, Wanderers ended their debut A-League season on a high after defeating Newcastle Jets 0–3 with two goals from Bridge and one from Visconte. The win secured Wanderers first place in the league, with the team winning the Premiers' Plate, as well as an A-League Finals position and a 2014 AFC Champions League spot.

On 12 April, Wanderers defeated Brisbane Roar 2–0 at home in the semi-final match of the A-League Finals, to secure a place in the Grand Final. Kresinger and Ono supplied the goals before Hersi was sent off after receiving a second yellow card. On 21 April, Wanderers played against Central Coast Mariners in the 2013 A-League Grand Final. The match, played at Sydney Football Stadium in front of a full crowd, saw Wanderers lose 0–2.

== Players ==
=== Squad information ===
N	Pos.	Nat.	Name	Age	Since	App	Goals	Ends	Transfer fee	Notes
1	GK	(Australia)	Ante Čović	37	2012	29	0	2013	Free	
2	DF	(Australia)	Shannon Cole	28	2012	22	1	2014	Free	
3	DF	(Australia)	Adam D'Apuzzo	26	2012	23	0	2014	Free	
4	DF	(Australia)	Nikolai Topor-Stanley	27	2012	29	1	2013	Free	
5	DF	(Australia)	Michael Beauchamp (captain)	32	2012	24	1	2015	Free	
6	MF	(Germany)	Jérome Polenz	26	2012	25	0	2013	Free	
7	FW	(Australia)	Labinot Haliti	27	2012	19	5	2013	Free	
8	MF	(Croatia)	Mateo Poljak	23	2012	25	1	2013	Free	
9	FW	(Croatia)	Dino Kresinger	31	2012	25	2	2013	Free	
10	MF	(Australia)	Aaron Mooy	22	2012	23	1	2013	Free	
11	DF	(Australia)	Tarek Elrich (vice-captain)	26	2012	11	0	2013	Free	
12	FW	(Australia)	Tahj Minniecon	24	2012	5	0	2013	Free	
13	MF	(Australia)	Joey Gibbs	20	2012	13	2	2013	Free	
14	FW	(Australia)	Kwabena Appiah-Kubi	21	2012	13	0	2013	Free	
15	DF	(Australia)	Reece Caira	20	2012	2	0	2013	Free	
16	MF	(Australia)	Rocky Visconte	22	2013	3	1	2013	Free	
17	MF	(Netherlands)	Youssouf Hersi	30	2012	23	5	2013	Free	
18	DF	(Italy)	Iacopo La Rocca	29	2012	20	3	2013	Free	
19	FW	(Australia)	Mark Bridge	27	2012	27	11	2013	Free	
20	GK	(Australia)	Jerrad Tyson	23	2012	0	0	2013	Free	
21	MF	(Japan)	Shinji Ono	33	2012	26	8	2014	Free	
23	MF	(Australia)	Jason Trifiro	24	2012	13	0	2013	Free	
24	MF	(Australia)	Yianni Perkatis	19	2013	2	0	2015	Youth system	
30	GK	(Australia)	Carlos Saliadarre	19	2013	0	0	2013	Free	Injury replacement
—	MF	(Australia)	Josh Barresi	18	2013	0	0	2015	Free	Injury replacement

- Last updated: 21 April 2013
- Source: westsydneyfootball.com

=== Transfers in ===
No.	Pos.	Nat.	Name	Age	Moving from	Type	Transfer window	Ends	Transfer fee	Source
1	GK	(Australia)	Ante Čović	37	Melbourne Victory	Transfer	Pre-season	2013	Free	footballaustralia.com.au
2	DF	(Australia)	Shannon Cole	28	Sydney FC	Transfer	Pre-season	2013	Free	footballaustralia.com.au
3	DF	(Australia)	Adam D'Apuzzo	26	APIA Leichhardt Tigers	Transfer	Pre-season	2013	Free	smh.com.au
4	DF	(Australia)	Nikolai Topor-Stanley	27	Newcastle Jets	Transfer	Pre-season	2013	Free	footballaustralia.com.au
5	DF	(Australia)	Michael Beauchamp	32	Sydney FC	Transfer	Pre-season	2015	Free	footballaustralia.com.au
6	MF	(Germany)	Jérome Polenz	26	Union Berlin (Germany)	Transfer	Pre-season	2013	Free	footballaustralia.com.au
7	FW	(Australia)	Labinot Haliti	27	Newcastle Jets	Transfer	Pre-season	2013	Free	footballaustralia.com.au
8	MF	(Croatia)	Mateo Poljak	23	Dinamo Zagreb (Croatia)	Transfer	Pre-season	2013	Free	footballaustralia.com.au
9	FW	(Croatia)	Dino Kresinger	31	Cibalia (Croatia)	Transfer	Pre-season	2013	Free	footballaustralia.com.au
10	MF	(Australia)	Aaron Mooy	22	St Mirren (Scotland)	Transfer	Pre-season	2013	Free	footballaustralia.com.au
11	DF	(Australia)	Tarek Elrich	26	Newcastle Jets	Transfer	Pre-season	2013	Free	footballaustralia.com.au
12	FW	(Australia)	Tahj Minniecon	24	Gold Coast United	Transfer	Pre-season	2013	Free	footballaustralia.com.au
13	MF	(Australia)	Joey Gibbs	20	Marconi Stallions	Transfer	Pre-season	2013	Free	footballaustralia.com.au
14	FW	(Australia)	Kwabena Appiah-Kubi	21	Central Coast Mariners	Transfer	Pre-season	2013	Free	footballaustralia.com.au
15	DF	(Australia)	Reece Caira	20	Aston Villa (England)	Transfer	Pre-season	2013	Free	footballaustralia.com.au
16	MF	(Australia)	Rocky Visconte	22	Brisbane Roar	Transfer	Pre-season	2013	Free	footballaustralia.com.au
17	MF	(Netherlands)	Youssouf Hersi	30	Alki Larnaca (Cyprus)	Transfer	Pre-season	2013	Free	footballaustralia.com.au
18	DF	(Italy)	Iacopo La Rocca	29	Grasshoppers (Switzerland)	Transfer	Pre-season	2013	Free	footballaustralia.com.au
19	FW	(Australia)	Mark Bridge	27	Sydney FC	Transfer	Pre-season	2013	Free	footballaustralia.com.au
20	GK	(Australia)	Jerrad Tyson	23	Gold Coast United	Transfer	Pre-season	2013	Free	footballaustralia.com.au
21	MF	(Japan)	Shinji Ono	33	Shimizu S-Pulse (Japan)	Transfer	Pre-season	2014	Free	footballaustralia.com.au
23	MF	(Australia)	Jason Trifiro	24	South Melbourne	Transfer	Pre-season	2013	Free	footballaustralia.com.au
—	MF	(Australia)	Josh Barresi	18	Australian Institute of Sport	Transfer	Mid-season	2013	Free	footballaustralia.com.au
30	GK	(Australia)	Carlos Saliadarre	19	Blacktown Spartans	Transfer	Mid-season	2013	Free	westsydneyfootball.com

== Technical staff ==
Position	Name
Manager	(Australia) Tony Popovic
Assistant manager	(Australia) Ante Milicic
Goalkeeping coach	(Australia) Ron Corry
Strength & Conditioning Coach	(Australia) Adam Waterson
Physiotherapist	(Australia) David Hughes

== Statistics ==
=== Squad statistics ===
N	Pos.	Nat.	Name	Total					A-League
N	Pos.	Nat.	Name	Apps	Goals	Yellow card	Second yellow card	Red card	Apps	Goals	Yellow card	Second yellow card	Red card
1	GK	(Australia)	Ante Čović	29	0	2	0	0	29+0	0	2	0	0
2	DF	(Australia)	Shannon Cole	22	1	3	0	0	11+11	1	3	0	0
3	DF	(Australia)	Adam D'Apuzzo	23	0	7	0	0	23+0	0	7	0	0
4	DF	(Australia)	Nikolai Topor-Stanley	29	1	3	0	0	29+0	1	3	0	0
5	DF	(Australia)	Michael Beauchamp	24	1	6	0	0	24+0	1	6	0	0
6	MF	(Germany)	Jérome Polenz	25	0	4	0	1	25+0	0	4	0	1
7	FW	(Australia)	Labinot Haliti	19	5	2	0	0	8+11	5	2	0	0
8	MF	(Croatia)	Mateo Poljak	25	1	5	0	0	25+0	1	5	0	0
9	FW	(Croatia)	Dino Kresinger	25	2	4	0	0	17+8	2	4	0	0
10	MF	(Australia)	Aaron Mooy	23	1	6	0	0	20+3	1	6	0	0
11	DF	(Australia)	Tarek Elrich	11	0	1	0	0	2+9	0	1	0	0
12	FW	(Australia)	Tahj Minniecon	5	0	0	0	0	1+4	0	0	0	0
13	MF	(Australia)	Joey Gibbs	13	2	1	0	0	8+5	2	1	0	0
14	FW	(Australia)	Kwabena Appiah-Kubi	13	0	1	0	0	4+9	0	1	0	0
15	DF	(Australia)	Reece Caira	2	0	0	0	0	0+2	0	0	0	0
16	MF	(Australia)	Rocky Visconte	3	1	0	0	0	0+3	1	0	0	0
17	MF	(Netherlands)	Youssouf Hersi	23	5	8	1	1	22+1	5	8	1	1
18	DF	(Italy)	Iacopo La Rocca	20	3	5	0	1	16+4	3	5	0	1
19	FW	(Australia)	Mark Bridge	27	11	1	0	0	26+1	11	1	0	0
20	GK	(Australia)	Jerrad Tyson	0	0	0	0	0	0+0	0	0	0	0
21	MF	(Japan)	Shinji Ono	26	8	2	0	0	23+3	8	2	0	0
23	MF	(Australia)	Jason Trifiro	13	0	0	1	0	4+9	0	0	1	0
24	MF	(Australia)	Yianni Perkatis	2	0	0	0	0	2+0	0	0	0	0
30	GK	(Australia)	Carlos Saliadarre	0	0	0	0	0	0+0	0	0	0	0

- Last updated: 23 April 2013
- Source: espnfc.com
- (yellow card) = Number of bookings; (second yellow card) = Number of sending offs after a second yellow card; (red card) = Number of sending offs by a direct red card.

=== Goal scorers ===
Rank	Player		Goals per Game																													
Rank	Player		1	2	3	4	5	6	7	8	9	10	11	12	13	14	15	16	17	18	19	20	21	22	23	24	25	26	27	SF	GF	Total
1	(Australia)	Mark Bridge				1	1							3					1		1	1				1			2			11
2	(Japan)	Shinji Ono										1		1		2				1			1			1				1		8
3	(Netherlands)	Youssouf Hersi											1						1		2	1										5
3	(Australia)	Labinot Haliti													1			1							1		2					5
5	(Italy)	Iacopo La Rocca							1														1				1					3
6	(Australia)	Joey Gibbs						1						1																		2
6	(Croatia)	Dino Kresinger												1																1		2
8	(Australia)	Michael Beauchamp											1																			1
8	(Australia)	Nikolai Topor-Stanley																1														1
8	(Croatia)	Mateo Poljak																			1											1
8	(Australia)	Aaron Mooy																						1								1
8	(Australia)	Shannon Cole																										1				1
8	(Australia)	Rocky Visconte																											1			1
8	–	Own goal					1																									1

A goal was scored from a penalty kick
2 were scored from penalty kicks

== Pre-season and friendlies ==
25 July 2012 Friendly	Nepean (Australia)	0–5	(Australia) Western Sydney Wanderers	Sydney
19:30 AEST		Report	Haliti 43'; Gibbs 55', 65', 75', 85'	Stadium: Cook Park; Attendance: 3,500; Referee: Adam Malouf

1 August 2012 Friendly	Blacktown Spartans (Australia)	0–2	(Australia) Western Sydney Wanderers	Sydney
19:30 AEST		Report	Bridge 59'; Zucco 65'	Stadium: Blacktown International Sportspark; Attendance: 4,116; Referee: Strebre Delovski

8 August 2012 Friendly	Blacktown City (Australia)	0–2	(Australia) Western Sydney Wanderers	Sydney
19:00 AEST		Report	Haliti 10', 40'	Stadium: Lily Homes Stadium; Attendance: 3,472; Referee: Mark Crittenden

22 August 2012 Friendly	Sydney United (Australia)	2–1	(Australia) Western Sydney Wanderers	Sydney
19:30 AEST	Stamatellis 44'; Vidaic 80' (pen.)	Report	Bridge 61'	Stadium: Sydney United Sports Centre; Attendance: 1,200; Referee: Alan Milliner

27 August 2012 Friendly	Wynnum District (Australia)	0–1	(Australia) Western Sydney Wanderers	Brisbane
19:00 AEST		Report	Bridge 80' (pen.)	Stadium: Carmichael Park; Attendance: 3,000

31 August 2012 Foster Cup	Melbourne Heart (Australia)	0–0 (5–3 p)	(Australia) Western Sydney Wanderers	Lismore
19:00 AEST		Report		Stadium: Oakes Oval; Attendance: 3,300
	Penalties
	(penalty scored) (penalty scored) (penalty scored) (penalty scored); Behich (penalty scored)		(penalty scored) Topor-Stanley; (penalty missed) La Rocca (penalty scored); (penalty scored) Kresinger

9 September 2012 Friendly	Western Sydney Wanderers (Australia)	1–0	(Australia) Parramatta	Sydney
19:00 AEST	Kresinger 60'	Report		Stadium: Parramatta Stadium; Attendance: 1,063

15 September 2012 Friendly	Newcastle Jets (Australia)	1–1	(Australia) Western Sydney Wanderers	Newcastle
14:00 AEST	Neville 7'	Report	Kresinger 60'	Stadium: Wanderers Oval; Attendance: 4,000; Referee: Ben Williams

23 September 2012 Friendly	Wellington Phoenix (Australia)	1–1	(Australia) Western Sydney Wanderers	Christchurch
12:30 AEST	Brockie 50'	Report	Mooy 30'	Stadium: AMI Stadium; Attendance: 7,009; Referee: Ben Williams

27 September 2012 Friendly	Bankstown City Lions (Australia)	0–3	(Australia) Western Sydney Wanderers	Sydney
19:30 AEST		Report	Mooy 5'; Trifiro 43'; Olsen 47'	Stadium: Jensen Oval; Attendance: 2,000

== Competitions ==
=== Overall ===
Competition	Started round	Final position / round	First match	Last match
A-League	—	Premiers	6 October 2012	29 March 2013
A-League Finals	Semi-finals	Runners-up	12 April 2013	21 April 2013
National Youth League	—	7th	21 October 2012	24 February 2013

=== A-League ===
==== League table ====
Pos	Team	Pld	W	D	L	GF	GA	GD	Pts	Qualification
1	Western Sydney Wanderers	27	18	3	6	41	21	+20	57	Qualification for 2014 AFC Champions League group stage and finals series
2	Central Coast Mariners (C)	27	16	6	5	48	22	+26	54	Qualification for 2014 AFC Champions League group stage and finals series
3	Melbourne Victory	27	13	5	9	48	45	+3	44	Qualification for 2014 AFC Champions League qualifying play-off and finals series (Note: Since the winner of 2013 A-League Grand Final (Central Coast Mariners) qualified for the 2014 AFC Champions League group stage, the 3rd placed team qualified for the qualifying play-off of 2014 AFC Champions League.)
4	Adelaide United	27	12	5	10	38	37	+1	41	Qualification for Finals series
5	Brisbane Roar	27	10	5	12	33	29	+4	35	Qualification for Finals series
6	Perth Glory	27	9	5	13	29	31	−2	32	Qualification for Finals series
7	Sydney FC	27	9	5	13	41	51	−10	32	
8	Newcastle Jets	27	8	7	12	30	45	−15	31	
9	Melbourne Heart	27	8	3	16	31	40	−9	27	
10	Wellington Phoenix (Note: Wellington Phoenix cannot qualify for the AFC Champions League as they are not recognised as an AFC club.)	27	7	6	14	31	49	−18	27	

Updated to match(es) played on 30 March 2013. Source: ultimatealeague.com
Rules for classification: 1) points; 2) goal difference; 3) number of goals scored.
(C) Champions

==== Results summary ====
Overall								Home						Away					
Pld	W	D	L	GF	GA	GD	Pts	W	D	L	GF	GA	GD	W	D	L	GF	GA	GD
27	18	3	6	41	21	+20	57	8	2	4	19	13	+6	10	1	2	22	8	+14

Last updated: 30 March 2013.
Source: theworldgame.sbs.com.au

==== Results by round ====
Round	1	2	3	4	5	6	7	8	9	10	11	12	13	14	15	16	17	18	19	20	21	22	23	24	25	26	27
Ground	H	A	H	A	H	H	A	H	A	H	A	H	A	H	H	A	A	H	A	H	A	H	A	H	A	H	A
Result	D	L	L	W	W	L	W	L	L	W	W	W	D	W	L	W	W	W	W	W	W	W	W	W	W	D	W
Position	5	8	10	8	5	7	5	6	8	4	4	4	4	3	4	4	4	3	3	2	2	2	1	1	1	1	1

Updated to match(es) played on 29 March 2013. Source: A-League
A = Away; H = Home; W = Win; D = Draw; L = Loss

==== Matches ====
6 October 2012 Round 1	Western Sydney Wanderers	0–0	Central Coast Mariners	Sydney
20:45 AEST (UTC+10)		Report; Summary		Stadium: Parramatta Stadium; Attendance: 10,458; Referee: Alan Milliner

12 October 2012 Round 2	Adelaide United	1–0	Western Sydney Wanderers	Adelaide
20:30 AEST (UTC+11)	Neumann 69'	Report; Summary		Stadium: Hindmarsh Stadium; Attendance: 8,950; Referee: Brenton Hayward

20 October 2012 Round 3	Western Sydney Wanderers	0–1	Sydney FC	Sydney
20:45 AEDT (UTC+11)		Report; Summary	Del Piero 54' (pen.)	Stadium: Parramatta Stadium; Attendance: 19,126; Referee: Strebre Delovski

27 October 2012 Round 4	Brisbane Roar	0–1	Western Sydney Wanderers	Brisbane
20:45 AEDT (UTC+11)		Report; Summary	Bridge 19'	Stadium: Suncorp Stadium; Attendance: 12,663; Referee: Lucien Laverdue

2 November 2012 Round 5	Western Sydney Wanderers	2–1	Melbourne Heart	Sydney
19:30 AEDT (UTC+11)	Bridge 28'; Gerhardt 51' (o.g.)	Report; Summary	Tadic 57'	Stadium: Parramatta Stadium; Attendance: 8,075; Referee: Regis Queffelec

10 November 2012 Round 6	Western Sydney Wanderers	1–2	Newcastle Jets	Sydney
17:30 AEDT (UTC+11)	Gibbs 15'	Report; Summary	Griffiths 28'; Heskey 38'; Pepper (yellow card) 84' (yellow-red card) 90'	Stadium: Parramatta Stadium; Attendance: 9,011; Referee: Brenton Haywood

18 November 2012 Round 7	Perth Glory	0–1	Western Sydney Wanderers	Perth
17:00 AEDT (UTC+11)		Report; Summary	La Rocca 15'; Hersi (red card) 38'	Stadium: nib Stadium, Attendance: 8,060; Referee: Kris Griffiths-Jones

24 November 2012 Round 8	Western Sydney Wanderers	0–2	Melbourne Victory	Parramatta
19:45 AEDT (UTC+11)		Report; Summary	Gallagher (red card) 16'; Beauchamp 44' (o.g.); Thompson 60'	Stadium: Parramatta Stadium; Attendance: 9,614; Referee: Ben William

2 December 2012 Round 9	Wellington Phoenix	1–0	Western Sydney Wanderers	Wellington
14:30 AEDT (UTC+11)	Brockie 22'	Report; Summary		Stadium: Westpac Stadium; Attendance: 5,405; Referee: Matthew Gillett

9 December 2012 Round 10	Western Sydney Wanderers	1–0	Brisbane Roar	Sydney
17:00 AEDT (UTC+11)	Ono 87' (pen.)	Report; Summary		Stadium: Parramatta Stadium; Attendance: 6,755; Referee: Alan Milliner

15 December 2012 Round 11	Sydney FC	0–2	Western Sydney Wanderers	Sydney
19:45 AEDT (UTC+11)		Report; Summary	Hersi 24'; Beauchamp 77'	Stadium: Allianz Stadium; Attendance: 26,176; Referee: Chris Beath

21 December 2012 Round 12	Western Sydney Wanderers	6–1	Adelaide United	Sydney
19:00 AEDT (UTC+11)	Bridge 18', 45', 58'; Kresinger 45+3'; Ono 52'; Gibbs 90'	Report; Summary	Vidošić 68'	Stadium: Parramatta Stadium; Attendance: 9,056; Referee: Jarred Gillett

27 December 2012 Round 13	Perth Glory	1–1	Western Sydney Wanderers	Perth
21:45 AEDT (UTC+11)	Ward 87'	Report; Summary	Haliti 38'	Stadium: Patersons Stadium; Attendance: 9,236; Referee: Ben Williams

1 January 2013 Round 14	Western Sydney Wanderers	2–1	Melbourne Victory	Sydney
18:15 AEDT (UTC+11)	Ono 42', 79'	Report; Summary	Dilevski 72'	Stadium: Parramatta Stadium; Attendance: 13,659; Referee: Lucien Laverdue

6 January 2013 Round 15	Western Sydney Wanderers	0–2	Central Coast Mariners	Sydney
18:00 AEDT (UTC+11)	Trifiro (yellow card) 23' (yellow-red card) 54'	Report; Summary	McBreen 42', 90'	Stadium: Parramatta Stadium; Attendance: 16,387; Referee: Chris Beath

13 January 2013 Round 16	Wellington Phoenix	0–2	Western Sydney Wanderers	Wellington
14:30 AEDT (UTC+11)		Report; Summary	Topor-Stanley 72'; Haliti 82'	Stadium: Westpac Stadium; Attendance: 6,608; Referee: Shaun Evans

20 January 2013 Round 17	Brisbane Roar	1–2	Western Sydney Wanderers	Brisbane
17:00 AEDT (UTC+11)	Nichols 22'	Report; Summary	Bridge 65'; Hersi 70'	Stadium: Suncorp Stadium; Attendance: 11,917; Referee: Matthew Gillett

26 January 2013 Round 18	Western Sydney Wanderers	1–0	Melbourne Heart	Sydney
19:45 AEDT (UTC+11)	Polenz (red card) 13'; Ono 73' (pen.)	Report; Summary		Stadium: Parramatta Stadium; Attendance: 14,624; Referee: Strebre Delovski

3 February 2013 Round 19	Adelaide United	2–4	Western Sydney Wanderers	Adelaide
17:00 AEDT (UTC+11)	Djite 61'; Ramsay 87'	Report; Summary	Hersi 43', 52'; Bridge 45'; Poljak 68'	Stadium: Hindmarsh Stadium; Attendance: 9,686; Referee: Chris Beath

9 February 2013 Round 20	Western Sydney Wanderers	2–1	Newcastle Jets	Sydney
19:45 AEDT (UTC+11)	Hersi 45+3'; Bridge 83'	Report; Summary	Zadkovich 90+1'	Stadium: Campbelltown Stadium; Attendance: 10,589; Referee: Peter Green

16 February 2013 Round 21	Melbourne Victory	1–2	Western Sydney Wanderers	Melbourne
19:45 AEDT (UTC+11)	Pain 75'	Report; Summary	La Rocca 11'; Ono 72'	Stadium: AAMI Park; Attendance: 21,638; Referee: Peter Green

23 February 2013 Round 22	Western Sydney Wanderers	1–0	Perth Glory	Sydney
17:30 AEDT (UTC+11)	Mooy 58'	Report; Summary		Stadium: Parramatta Stadium; Attendance: 11,772; Referee: Ben Williams

2 March 2013 Round 23	Central Coast Mariners	0–1	Western Sydney Wanderers	Gosford
19:45 AEDT (UTC+11)		Report; Summary	Haliti 81'	Stadium: Bluetongue Stadium; Attendance: 18,721; Referee: Alan Milliner

10 March 2013 Round 24	Western Sydney Wanderers	2–1	Wellington Phoenix	Sydney
17:00 AEDT (UTC+11)	Ono 8' (pen.); Bridge 49' (pen.)	Report; Summary	Brockie 22'	Stadium: Parramatta Stadium; Attendance: 15,809; Referee: Strebre Delovski

16 March 2013 Round 25	Melbourne Heart	1–3	Western Sydney Wanderers	Melbourne
17:30 AEDT (UTC+11)	Mebrahtu 39'; Colosimo (red card) 80'	Report; Summary	Haliti 20', 60'; La Rocca 89'	Stadium: AAMI Park; Attendance: 6,101; Referee: Ben Williams

23 March 2013 Round 26	Western Sydney Wanderers	1–1	Sydney FC	Sydney
19:45 AEDT (UTC+11)	Cole 70'; La Rocca (red card) 90+5'	Report; Summary	Del Piero 34'; Emerton (yellow card) 51' (yellow-red card) 56'	Stadium: Parramatta Stadium; Attendance: 19,585; Referee: Alan Milliner

29 March 2013 Round 27	Newcastle Jets	0–3	Western Sydney Wanderers	Newcastle
17:30 AEDT (UTC+11)		Report; Summary	Bridge 6', 33'; Visconte 80'	Stadium: Hunter Stadium; Attendance: 22,518; Referee: Ben Williams

==== Finals series ====
12 April 2013 Semi-final	Western Sydney Wanderers	2–0	Brisbane Roar	Parramatta
Friday 19:30 AEST	Kresinger 16'; Ono 71'; Hersi (yellow card) 34' (yellow-red card) 77'	Report		Stadium: Parramatta Stadium; Attendance: 19,369; Referee: Alan Milliner

21 April 2013 Grand Final	Western Sydney Wanderers	0–2	Central Coast Mariners	Sydney
Sunday 16:00 AEST		Report	Zwaanswijk 44'; McBreen 68' (pen.)	Stadium: Allianz Stadium; Attendance: 42,102; Referee: Peter Green

== See also ==
- 2012–13 Western Sydney Wanderers W-League season
