= 2014 FIFA Club World Cup =

FIFA Club World Cup Morocco 2014 presented by Toyota كأس العالم للأندية لكرة القدم المغرب 2014

Tournament details
- Host country: Morocco
- Dates: 10–20 December
- Teams: 7 (from 6 confederations)
- Venues: 2 (in 2 host cities)

Final positions
- Champions: (Spain) Real Madrid (1st title)
- Runners-up: (Argentina) San Lorenzo
- Third place: (New Zealand) Auckland City
- Fourth place: (Mexico) Cruz Azul

Tournament statistics
- Matches played: 8
- Goals scored: 20 (2.5 per match)
- Attendance: 228,021 (28,503 per match)
- Top scorer(s): Gareth Bale (Real Madrid); Sergio Ramos (Real Madrid); Gerardo Torrado (Cruz Azul); 2 goals each
- Best player: Sergio Ramos (Real Madrid)
- Fair play award: (Spain) Real Madrid

The 2014 FIFA Club World Cup (officially known as the FIFA Club World Cup Morocco 2014 presented by Toyota for sponsorship reasons) was the 11th edition of the FIFA Club World Cup, a FIFA-organised international club football tournament between the winners of the six continental confederations as well as the host nation's league champions. It was hosted by Morocco for the second consecutive season, and played from 10 to 20 December 2014.

Bayern Munich could not defend their title having been eliminated in the semi-finals of the 2013–14 UEFA Champions League by eventual winners Real Madrid. The Spanish side went on to beat Mexico's Cruz Azul 4–0 in the Club World Cup semi-finals, before defeating San Lorenzo 2–0 in the final to give them their first Club World Cup title. Including the 1960, 1998 and 2002 Intercontinental Cups, it was Real Madrid's fourth world club title, equalling Milan's record.

== Host bids ==
There were four countries bidding to host the 2013 and 2014 tournaments (same host for both tournaments):

- Iran
- Morocco
- South Africa
- United Arab Emirates (which hosted the 2009 and 2010 editions in Abu Dhabi)

In October 2011, FIFA said that Iran, South Africa and the United Arab Emirates all withdrew their bids, leaving Morocco as the only bidder. The FIFA Executive Committee officially confirmed Morocco as host on 17 December 2011 during their meeting in Tokyo, Japan.

On 21 August 2014, FIFA issued a statement reconfirming Morocco as the host, despite recent rumours that a change in venue might be sought due to the 2014 West Africa Ebola virus outbreak. Morocco had cancelled its hosting of the 2015 Africa Cup of Nations due to fears of Ebola, but vowed to host the Club World Cup as no entrants would be from the countries with the most severe Ebola outbreaks.

== Qualified teams ==
Location of teams of the 2014 FIFA Club World Cup

Team	Confederation	Qualification	Participation
Entering in the semi-finals
(Spain) Real Madrid	UEFA	Winners of the 2013–14 UEFA Champions League	2nd (Previous: 2000)
(Argentina) San Lorenzo	CONMEBOL	Winners of the 2014 Copa Libertadores	Debut
Entering in the quarter-finals
(Mexico) Cruz Azul	CONCACAF	Winners of the 2013–14 CONCACAF Champions League	Debut
(Algeria) ES Sétif	CAF	Winners of the 2014 CAF Champions League	Debut
(Australia) Western Sydney Wanderers	AFC	Winners of the 2014 AFC Champions League	Debut
Entering in the play-off for quarter-finals
(New Zealand) Auckland City	OFC	Winners of the 2013–14 OFC Champions League	6th (Previous: 2006, 2009, 2011, 2012, 2013)
(Morocco) Moghreb Tétouan	CAF (hosts)	Winners of the 2013–14 Botola	Debut

== Venues ==
The venues for the 2014 FIFA Club World Cup were in Rabat and Marrakesh.

2014 FIFA Club World Cup is located in Morocco	Rabat	Marrakesh
2014 FIFA Club World Cup is located in Morocco	Prince Moulay Abdellah Stadium	Stade de Marrakesh
2014 FIFA Club World Cup is located in Morocco	33°57′35.55″N 6°53′20.81″W	31°42′24″N 7°58′50″W
2014 FIFA Club World Cup is located in Morocco	Capacity: 52,000	Capacity: 41,245

== Match officials ==
The appointed match officials were:

Confederation	Referee	Assistant referees
AFC	(Australia) Benjamin Williams	(Australia) Matthew Cream (Australia) Paul Cetrangolo
CAF	(Ivory Coast) Noumandiez Doué	(Ivory Coast) Songuifolo Yéo (Burundi) Jean-Claude Birumushahu
CONCACAF	(Guatemala) Walter López	(Costa Rica) Leonel Leal (Guatemala) Gerson López
CONMEBOL (Note: The Chilean officiating team from CONMEBOL replaced the original Colombian trio of Wilmar Roldán, Eduardo Díaz and Alexander Guzmán.)	(Chile) Enrique Osses	(Chile) Carlos Astroza (Chile) Sergio Román
OFC	(French Polynesia) Norbert Hauata	(Tonga) Tevita Makasini (French Polynesia) Paul Ahupu
UEFA	(Portugal) Pedro Proença	(Portugal) Bertino Miranda (Portugal) Tiago Trigo

== Squads ==
Each team named a 23-man squad (three of whom must be goalkeepers) by the FIFA deadline of 28 November 2014. Injury replacements were allowed until 24 hours before the team's first match. The squads were announced by FIFA on 4 December 2014.

== Matches ==
If a match was tied after normal playing time:

- For elimination matches, extra time was played. If still tied after extra time, a penalty shoot-out was held to determine the winner.
- For the matches for fifth place and third place, no extra time was played, and a penalty shoot-out was held to determine the winner.

Play-off for quarter-finals
10 December – Rabat
(Morocco) Moghreb Tétouan	0 (3)
(New Zealand) Auckland City (p)	0 (4)

Quarter-finals
13 December – Rabat
(Mexico) Cruz Azul (a.e.t.)	3
(Australia) Western Sydney Wanderers	1
13 December – Rabat
(Algeria) ES Sétif	0
(New Zealand) Auckland City	1

Semi-finals
16 December – Marrakesh
(Mexico) Cruz Azul	0
(Spain) Real Madrid	4
17 December – Marrakesh
(Argentina) San Lorenzo (a.e.t.)	2
(New Zealand) Auckland City	1
Match for fifth place
17 December – Marrakesh
(Algeria) ES Sétif (p)	2 (5)
(Australia) Western Sydney Wanderers	2 (4)

Final
20 December – Marrakesh
(Spain) Real Madrid	2
(Argentina) San Lorenzo	0
Match for third place
20 December – Marrakesh
(Mexico) Cruz Azul	1 (2)
(New Zealand) Auckland City (p)	1 (4)

All times are local, WET (UTC±0).

=== Play-off for quarter-finals ===
10 December 2014
19:30

Moghreb Tétouan (Morocco)	0–0 (a.e.t.)	(New Zealand) Auckland City
	Report
Penalties
Jahouh (penalty missed); Krouch (penalty scored); Fall (penalty scored); Naïm (penalty scored); Khallati (penalty missed)	3–4	(penalty scored) Payne; (penalty scored) Irving; (penalty scored) White; (penalty missed) Bilen; (penalty scored) Issa

Prince Moulay Abdellah Stadium, Rabat
Attendance: 35,247
Referee: Walter López (Guatemala)

=== Quarter-finals ===
A draw was held on 11 October 2014 at 19:00 WEST (UTC+1), at the La Mamounia Hotel in Marrakesh, to determine the pairings of the four quarter-finalists.

13 December 2014
16:00

ES Sétif (Algeria)	0–1	(New Zealand) Auckland City
	Report	Irving 52'

Prince Moulay Abdellah Stadium, Rabat
Attendance: 22,153
Referee: Pedro Proença (Portugal)

13 December 2014
19:30

Cruz Azul (Mexico)	3–1 (a.e.t.)	(Australia) Western Sydney Wanderers
Torrado 89' (pen.), 118' (pen.); Pavone 108'	Report	La Rocca 65'

Prince Moulay Abdellah Stadium, Rabat
Attendance: 22,153
Referee: Noumandiez Doué (Ivory Coast)

=== Semi-finals ===
The first semi-final was originally to be played at Prince Moulay Abdellah Stadium, Rabat, but was moved to Stade de Marrakech, Marrakesh due to difficult pitch conditions.

16 December 2014
19:30

Cruz Azul (Mexico)	0–4	(Spain) Real Madrid
	Report	Ramos 15'; Benzema 36'; Bale 50'; Isco 72'

Stade de Marrakech, Marrakesh
Attendance: 34,862
Referee: Enrique Osses (Chile)

17 December 2014
19:30

San Lorenzo (Argentina)	2–1 (a.e.t.)	(New Zealand) Auckland City
Barrientos 45+2'; Matos 93'	Report	Berlanga 67'

Stade de Marrakech, Marrakesh
Attendance: 18,458
Referee: Benjamin Williams (Australia)

=== Match for fifth place ===
17 December 2014
16:30

ES Sétif (Algeria)	2–2	(Australia) Western Sydney Wanderers
Mullen 50' (o.g.); Ziaya 57'	Report	Castelen 5'; Saba 89'
Penalties
Djahnit (penalty missed); Gasmi (penalty scored); Belameiri (penalty scored); Ziaya (penalty missed); Mellouli (penalty scored); Arroussi (penalty missed); Megateli (penalty scored); Zerara (penalty scored)	5–4	(penalty scored) Saba; (penalty missed) Haliti; (penalty scored) Trifiro; (penalty scored) Juric; (penalty missed) Bouzanis; (penalty missed) Mullen; (penalty scored) Fofanah; (penalty missed) Adeleke

Stade de Marrakech, Marrakesh
Attendance: 18,458
Referee: Norbert Hauata (Tahiti)

=== Match for third place ===
20 December 2014
16:30

Cruz Azul (Mexico)	1–1	(New Zealand) Auckland City
Rojas 57'	Report	De Vries 45+2'
Penalties
Giménez (penalty scored); Formica (penalty missed); Rodríguez (penalty scored); Valadéz (penalty missed)	2–4	(penalty scored) Payne; (penalty missed) Irving; (penalty scored) White; (penalty scored) Pritchett; (penalty scored) Issa

Stade de Marrakech, Marrakesh
Attendance: 38,345
Referee: Pedro Proença (Portugal)

=== Final ===
20 December 2014
19:30

Real Madrid (Spain)	2–0	(Argentina) San Lorenzo
Ramos 37'; Bale 51'	Report

Stade de Marrakech, Marrakesh
Attendance: 38,345
Referee: Walter López (Guatemala)

== Goalscorers ==
Rank	Player	Team	Goals
1	(Wales) Gareth Bale	(Spain) Real Madrid	2
1	(Spain) Sergio Ramos	(Spain) Real Madrid	2
1	(Mexico) Gerardo Torrado	(Mexico) Cruz Azul	2
4	(Spain) Ángel Berlanga	(New Zealand) Auckland City	1
4	(New Zealand) Ryan De Vries	(New Zealand) Auckland City	1
4	(England) John Irving	(New Zealand) Auckland City	1
4	(Argentina) Mariano Pavone	(Mexico) Cruz Azul	1
4	(Ecuador) Joao Rojas	(Mexico) Cruz Azul	1
4	(France) Karim Benzema	(Spain) Real Madrid	1
4	(Spain) Isco	(Spain) Real Madrid	1
4	(Argentina) Pablo Barrientos	(Argentina) San Lorenzo	1
4	(Argentina) Mauro Matos	(Argentina) San Lorenzo	1
4	(Algeria) Abdelmalek Ziaya	(Algeria) ES Sétif	1
4	(Netherlands) Romeo Castelen	(Australia) Western Sydney Wanderers	1
4	(Italy) Iacopo La Rocca	(Australia) Western Sydney Wanderers	1
4	(Brazil) Vítor Saba	(Australia) Western Sydney Wanderers	1

1 own goal

- (Australia) Daniel Mullen (Western Sydney Wanderers, against ES Sétif)

== Awards ==
The following awards were given at the conclusion of the tournament.

Adidas Golden Ball Toyota Award	Adidas Silver Ball	Adidas Bronze Ball
(Spain) Sergio Ramos (Real Madrid)	(Portugal) Cristiano Ronaldo (Real Madrid)	(New Zealand) Ivan Vicelich (Auckland City)
FIFA Fair Play Award
(Spain) Real Madrid

FIFA also named a man of the match for the best player in each game at the tournament.

Toyota Match Award
Match	Man of the match	Club	Opponent
1	(New Zealand) Ivan Vicelich	(New Zealand) Auckland City	(Morocco) Moghreb Tétouan
2	(England) John Irving	(New Zealand) Auckland City	(Algeria) ES Sétif
3	(Mexico) Gerardo Torrado	(Mexico) Cruz Azul	(Australia) Western Sydney Wanderers
4	(France) Karim Benzema	(Spain) Real Madrid	(Mexico) Cruz Azul
5	(Algeria) Ahmed Gasmi	(Algeria) ES Sétif	(Australia) Western Sydney Wanderers
6	(Argentina) Pablo Barrientos	(Argentina) San Lorenzo	(New Zealand) Auckland City
7	(New Zealand) Tim Payne	(New Zealand) Auckland City	(Mexico) Cruz Azul
8	(Spain) Sergio Ramos	(Spain) Real Madrid	(Argentina) San Lorenzo
