= Trifiro =

Trifiro is a surname. Notable people with the surname include:

- Glen Trifiro (born 1987), Australian soccer player
- Jason Trifiro (born 1988), Australian soccer player
