= A-League transfers for 2013–14 season =

This is a list of the transfers for the 2013–14 A-League season. This list includes transfers featuring at least one A-League club. Promotions from youth squads to the first squad of the same club are not included.

== Transfers ==
All players without a flag are Australian. Clubs without a flag are clubs participating in the A-League.

=== Pre-season ===
Date	Name	Moving from	Moving to
8 April 2013	Iain Ramsay	Adelaide United	Melbourne Heart
20 April 2013	Eli Babalj	Melbourne Heart	(Netherlands) AZ Alkmaar
2 May 2013	Matthew Jurman	Brisbane Roar	Sydney FC
2 May 2013	Cameron Edwards	Melbourne Heart	Perth Glory
2 May 2013	Jack Duncan	Newcastle Jets	Perth Glory
8 May 2013	(New Zealand) Jeremy Brockie	Wellington Phoenix	(Canada) Toronto FC (loan)
8 May 2013	(New Zealand) Michael Boxall	Wellington Phoenix	(Australia) Oakleigh Cannons (loan)
13 May 2013	Joey Gibbs	Western Sydney Wanderers	Newcastle Jets
13 May 2013	Mitch Nichols	Brisbane Roar	Melbourne Victory
16 May 2013	Matt Simon	Unattached	Central Coast Mariners
20 May 2013	Tomi Juric	Adelaide United	Western Sydney Wanderers
20 May 2013	Massimo Murdocca	Brisbane Roar	Melbourne Heart
22 May 2013	(Republic of Ireland) Liam Miller	Perth Glory	Brisbane Roar
22 May 2013	Ben Halloran	Brisbane Roar	(Germany) Fortuna Düsseldorf
30 May 2013	Mathew Ryan	Central Coast Mariners	(Belgium) Club Brugge
1 June 2013	(Costa Rica) Carlos Hernández	(India) Prayag United	Wellington Phoenix
3 June 2013	John Solari	(Australia) White City	Newcastle Jets
4 June 2013	Bernie Ibini-Isei	Central Coast Mariners	(China) Shanghai SIPG
5 June 2013	Harry Kewell	Unattached	Melbourne Heart
8 June 2013	Daniel McBreen	Central Coast Mariners	(China) Shanghai SIPG (loan)
12 June 2013	(Netherlands) Rob Wielaert	(Netherlands) Roda JC	Melbourne Heart
14 June 2013	(Solomon Islands) Benjamin Totori	Wellington Phoenix	(Australia) Oakleigh Cannons
14 June 2013	Marc Warren	Unattached	Sydney FC
18 June 2013	Lewis Italiano	(Australia) Oakleigh Cannons	Wellington Phoenix
19 June 2013	Pedj Bojic	Central Coast Mariners	Sydney FC
19 June 2013	Oliver Bozanic	Central Coast Mariners	(Switzerland) Luzern
27 June 2013	Dimitri Petratos	(Malaysia) Kelantan	Brisbane Roar
27 June 2013	Diogo Ferreira	Melbourne Victory	Brisbane Roar
28 June 2013	Corey Gameiro	(England) Fulham	Sydney FC
1 July 2013	Dean Heffernan	(Australia) Dapto Dandaloo Fury	Western Sydney Wanderers
1 July 2013	Jamie Maclaren	Unattached	Perth Glory
4 July 2013	(Japan) Ryo Nagai	(Japan) Cerezo Osaka	Perth Glory (loan)
5 July 2013	(Argentina) Marcos Flores	Melbourne Victory	Central Coast Mariners
8 July 2013	(New Zealand) Storm Roux	Perth Glory	Central Coast Mariners
8 July 2013	Tom Slater	Sydney FC (Youth)	Central Coast Mariners
8 July 2013	(Spain) Isaías	(Spain) Espanyol	Adelaide United
8 July 2013	(Spain) Sergio Cirio	(Spain) Hospitalet	Adelaide United
9 July 2013	(Netherlands) Marcel Seip	(Netherlands) VVV-Venlo	Central Coast Mariners
9 July 2013	Tarek Elrich	Western Sydney Wanderers	Adelaide United
9 July 2013	(Panama) Yairo Yau	(Panama) Sporting San Miguelito	Sydney FC (loan)
13 July 2013	(New Zealand) Luke Adams	(England) Derby County	Wellington Phoenix
16 July 2013	(Brazil) Sidnei	Unattached	Perth Glory
16 July 2013	Ryan Edwards	(England) Reading	Perth Glory (loan)
16 July 2013	Joel Griffiths	Sydney FC	(China) Qingdao Jonoon
25 July 2013	Aziz Behich	(Turkey) Bursaspor	Melbourne Heart (loan)
25 July 2013	Tando Velaphi	Melbourne Victory	Melbourne Heart
25 July 2013	Nathan Burns	(South Korea) Incheon United	Newcastle Jets (loan)
26 July 2013	(Costa Rica) Kenny Cunningham	(Bolivia) The Strongest	Wellington Phoenix
30 July 2013	Billy Celeski	Melbourne Victory	(United Arab Emirates) Al-Shaab
31 July 2013	Reece Caira	Western Sydney Wanderers	Wellington Phoenix
2 August 2013	Brendon Santalab	(China) Chongqing Lifan	Western Sydney Wanderers
2 August 2013	(New Zealand) Alex Rufer	(New Zealand) Western Suburbs	Wellington Phoenix
7 August 2013	(New Zealand) Kosta Barbarouses	(Russia) Alania Vladikavkaz	Melbourne Victory
9 August 2013	(Netherlands) Orlando Engelaar	(Netherlands) PSV	Melbourne Heart
11 August 2013	Matt McKay	Unattached	Brisbane Roar
15 August 2013	(Netherlands) Kew Jaliens	(Poland) Wisła Kraków	Newcastle Jets
16 August 2013	Richard Garcia	Melbourne Heart	Sydney FC
20 August 2013	Ljubo Milicevic	Unattached	Perth Glory
23 August 2013	Liam Reddy	(Australia) Sydney United	Central Coast Mariners
26 August 2013	Dario Vidošić	Adelaide United	(Switzerland) Sion
26 August 2013	(New Zealand) Jeremy Brockie	(Canada) Toronto FC	Wellington Phoenix (end of loan)
29 August 2013	Michael Zullo	(Netherlands) Utrecht	Adelaide United (loan)
2 September 2013	(New Zealand) Michael Boxall	(Australia) Oakleigh Cannons	Wellington Phoenix (end of loan)
10 September 2013	Steven Lustica	(Croatia) Hajduk Split	Adelaide United
10 September 2013	Patrick Kisnorbo	Unattached	Melbourne Heart
18 September 2013	(Malta) Michael Mifsud	Unattached	Melbourne Heart
18 September 2013	Josh Brindell-South	(Australia) Moreton Bay United	Wellington Phoenix
19 September 2013	(Serbia) Nikola Petković	Unattached	Sydney FC
22 September 2013	(Chile) Pablo Contreras	(Greece) Olympiacos	Melbourne Victory
23 September 2013	(Italy) Andrea Migliorini	Unattached	Melbourne Heart
24 September 2013	James Troisi	(Italy) Atalanta	Melbourne Victory (loan)
1 October 2013	Matthew Spiranovic	(Qatar) Al-Arabi	Western Sydney Wanderers
4 October 2013	Brent McGrath	(Denmark) Brøndby	Adelaide United
4 October 2013	Rashid Mahazi	(Australia) Northcote City	Melbourne Victory
7 October 2013	(Spain) Albert Riera	(New Zealand) Auckland City	Wellington Phoenix
11 October 2013	Matt Thompson	Melbourne Heart	Sydney FC

=== Mid-season ===
Date	Name	Moving from	Moving to
23 October 2013	(Netherlands) Pascal Bosschaart	Sydney FC	Unattached
23 October 2013	(France) William Gallas	Unattached	Perth Glory
24 October 2013	(New Zealand) Jason Hicks	(New Zealand) Team Wellington	Wellington Phoenix
8 November 2013	(Serbia) Ranko Despotović	Unattached	Sydney FC
3 December 2013	Steve Pantelidis	Perth Glory	(Malaysia) Selangor
23 December 2013	Nick Ward	Perth Glory	Newcastle Jets
1 January 2014	Kwame Yeboah	Brisbane Roar	(Germany) Borussia Mönchengladbach
6 January 2014	(New Zealand) Michael McGlinchey	Central Coast Mariners	(Japan) Vegalta Sendai (loan)
6 January 2014	Bernie Ibini-Isei	(China) Shanghai SIPG	Central Coast Mariners (loan)
7 January 2014	(Fiji) Roy Krishna	(New Zealand) Auckland City	Wellington Phoenix
7 January 2014	(Mauritius) Jonathan Bru	Melbourne Victory	Unattached
8 January 2014	(Panama) Yairo Yau	Sydney FC	(Panama) Sporting San Miguelito (end of loan)
8 January 2014	Ryan Griffiths	Unattached	Adelaide United
11 January 2014	Joel Griffiths	(China) Qingdao Jonoon	Newcastle Jets
11 January 2014	(Japan) Ryo Nagai	Perth Glory	(Japan) Cerezo Osaka (end of loan)
16 January 2014	Brett Emerton	Sydney FC	Retired
17 January 2014	(Serbia) Miloš Dimitrijević	Unattached	Sydney FC
17 January 2014	Dylan Macallister	Melbourne Heart	(Hong Kong) Eastern Salon
20 January 2014	(Serbia) Nebojša Marinković	Unattached	Perth Glory
20 January 2014	Tom Rogic	(Scotland) Celtic	Melbourne Victory (loan)
20 January 2014	Mitch Nichols	Melbourne Victory	(Japan) Cerezo Osaka
23 January 2014	Rostyn Griffiths	(China) Guangzhou R&F	Perth Glory
24 January 2014	(Lithuania) Darvydas Šernas	(Turkey) Gaziantepspor	Perth Glory (loan)
29 January 2014	(Brazil) Tiago	Sydney FC	(United States) Minnesota United
29 January 2014	(Costa Rica) Jean Carlos Solórzano	Unattached	Brisbane Roar
31 January 2014	Trent Sainsbury	Central Coast Mariners	(Netherlands) PEC Zwolle
31 January 2014	Daniel McBreen	Central Coast Mariners	(China) Shanghai SIPG
1 February 2014	Eddy Bosnar	Unattached	Central Coast Mariners
2 February 2014	David Carney	Unattached	Newcastle Jets
2 February 2014	(South Korea) Kim Seung-yong	Unattached	Central Coast Mariners
3 February 2014	Golgol Mebrahtu	Melbourne Heart	Western Sydney Wanderers
3 February 2014	Daniel Mullen	(China) Dalian Aerbin	Western Sydney Wanderers
3 February 2014	Michael Marrone	Unattached	Adelaide United
4 February 2014	Sasa Ognenovski	Unattached	Sydney FC
4 February 2014	Steven Lustica	Adelaide United	Brisbane Roar
4 February 2014	Antony Golec	Adelaide United	Western Sydney Wanderers
5 February 2014	(New Zealand) Hamish Watson	(New Zealand) Team Wellington	Wellington Phoenix
5 February 2014	Glen Trifiro	(Australia) Sydney United	Central Coast Mariners (loan)
5 February 2014	Matt Sim	(Australia) Sutherland Sharks	Central Coast Mariners (loan)
5 February 2014	Isaka Cernak	Perth Glory	Central Coast Mariners
28 February 2014	Ndumba Makeche	Perth Glory	(Malaysia) FELDA United
3 March 2014	Danny Vukovic	Perth Glory	(Japan) Vegalta Sendai (loan)
6 March 2014	(Republic of Ireland) Shaun Timmins	(Australia) Green Gully	Wellington Phoenix
11 March 2014	Ryan Griffiths	Adelaide United	(Malaysia) Sarawak
18 March 2014	Teeboy Kamara	Adelaide United	(Australia) Inglewood United
21 March 2014	(Malta) Michael Mifsud	Melbourne Heart	Unattached
26 March 2014	Harry Kewell	Melbourne Heart	Retired

Player was released to free agency before joining new club
Player was only eligible to participate in their new club's 2014 AFC Champions League campaign during the 2013–14 season as there were no spaces remaining in that club's A-League squad at the time of signing.
