= 2013 A-League Grand Final =

- Event: 2012–13 A-League
Western Sydney Wanderers	Central Coast Mariners
0	2
- Date: 21 April 2013
- Venue: Sydney Football Stadium, Sydney
- Man of the Match: Daniel McBreen
- Referee: Peter Green
- Attendance: 42,102

The 2013 A-League Grand Final was the eighth A-League Grand Final, which took place at the Sydney Football Stadium on 21 April 2013. The match was won by Central Coast Mariners, who beat Western Sydney Wanderers 2–0, in front of 42,102 people. This was the first time the Central Coast Mariners became champions of Australia, after losing three previous grand finals.

== Route to the final ==
Both teams came into the final in good form, the Wanderers undefeated in 13 games and the Mariners having won their past 4 A-League games in a row. The sides had previously met three times over the course of the season, with each team winning one match as well as one draw.

In their inaugural season, Wanderers performed strongly. Mixed early results were followed by a streak of 12 undefeated games, including a run of 10 wins in a row, which saw the side top the regular season table, winning the A-League premiership. In the semi-final, the Wanderers beat Brisbane Roar 2–0, scoring a goal in each half to qualify for the grand final.

Entering the season as reigning A-League premiers, the Mariners had a strong season, highlighted by the fact that they lost only one match at their home ground, Bluetongue Stadium- against the Wanderers. After finishing second in the regular season, the Mariners played Melbourne Victory in the semi-final, winning 1-0 through a Daniel McBreen goal and so qualifying for the final.

The top six teams from the 2012–13 season qualified for the finals series, with the top two receiving byes into the semi-finals.

Elimination Finals
Adelaide United	1
Brisbane Roar	2
Melbourne Victory (a.e.t.)	2
Perth Glory	1

Semi-finals
Western Sydney Wanderers	2
Brisbane Roar	0
Central Coast Mariners	1
Melbourne Victory	0

Grand Final
Western Sydney Wanderers	0
Central Coast Mariners	2

== Match ==
=== Summary ===
It was announced by the FFA, following Western Sydney Wanderers earning the right to host the grand final, that the match would be played at the Sydney Football Stadium due to its greater capacity than the Wanderers usual home ground, Parramatta Stadium. The match was played in front of a sold-out crowd of 42,102 at the Sydney Football Stadium- the largest crowd of the 2012–13 A-League. In Australia, it was shown live on Fox Sports.

The first clear-cut chance of the match came when Trent Sainsbury played a ball over the top for Mile Sterjovski. Sterjovski got in behind the defence and chipped over Wanderers' 'keeper Ante Covic, only for his shot to hit the crossbar and bounce out for a goal kick. Shortly before half-time, the Mariners took the lead. Michael McGlinchey's corner found Patrick Zwaanswijk at the near post, whose powerful header put the Mariners ahead going into half-time.

Soon after play resumed, both Shinji Ono and Sterjovski had attempts on goal from attacking positions for their respective sides, but neither was able to put their shot on target. Midway through the half, the Mariners were awarded a penalty. It came after Daniel McBreen retrieved a ball deep inside the penalty area and cut back the bouncing ball, only for it to hit the arm of Jérome Polenz, leading Peter Green to award a penalty. From the resultant penalty, McBreen sent Covic the wrong way, powering his shot into the top left corner and giving the Mariners a two-goal advantage which they retained until the final whistle.

Daniel McBreen was awarded the Joe Marston Medal as man of the match. The win marked the Central Coast Mariners' first A-League Championship.

=== Details ===
21 April 2013
16:00 AEST

Western Sydney Wanderers	0–2	Central Coast Mariners
	Reports	Zwaanswijk 44'; McBreen 68' (pen.)

Sydney Football Stadium
Attendance: 42,102
Referee: Peter Green (Australia)

Western Sydney Wanderers	Central Coast Mariners

GK	1	(Australia) Ante Covic
RB	6	(Germany) Jérome Polenz	(substituted off) 76'
CB	4	(Australia) Nikolai Topor-Stanley
CB	5	(Australia) Michael Beauchamp (c)
LB	2	(Australia) Shannon Cole
DM	8	(Croatia) Mateo Poljak
CM	10	(Australia) Aaron Mooy
CM	21	(Japan) Shinji Ono
RW	14	(Australia) Kwabena Appiah-Kubi	(substituted off) 72'
LW	19	(Australia) Mark Bridge
FW	9	(Croatia) Dino Kresinger	(substituted off) 67'
Substitutes:
GK	30	(Australia) Carlos Saliadarre
DF	11	(Australia) Tarek Elrich	(substituted on) 72'
MF	16	(Australia) Rocky Visconte	(substituted on) 76'
MF	23	(Australia) Jason Trifiro
FW	7	(Australia) Labinot Haliti	(substituted on) 67'
Manager:
(Australia) Tony Popovic

GK	1	(Australia) Mathew Ryan
RB	4	(Australia) Pedj Bojic
CB	16	(Australia) Trent Sainsbury
CB	6	(Netherlands) Patrick Zwaanswijk
LB	3	(Australia) Joshua Rose
DM	7	(Malta) John Hutchinson (c)
DM	11	(Australia) Oliver Bozanic
RW	9	(Australia) Bernie Ibini-Isei
AM	2	(Australia) Daniel McBreen	(yellow card) 70'
LW	14	(New Zealand) Michael McGlinchey	(yellow card) 51'	(substituted off) 88'
FW	21	(Australia) Mile Sterjovski		(substituted off) 73'
Substitutes:
GK	20	(Australia) Justin Pasfield
DF	5	(Australia) Zachary Anderson
MF	17	(Australia) Anthony Caceres
MF	29	(Australia) Nicholas Fitzgerald		(substituted on) 88'
FW	19	(Australia) Mitchell Duke		(substituted on) 73'
Manager:
(Australia) Graham Arnold

Joe Marston Medal:
Daniel McBreen (Central Coast Mariners)

Assistant referees:
Nathan MacDonald
David Walsh
Fourth official:
Strebre Delovski

Match rules

- 90 minutes
- 30 minutes of extra-time if necessary.
- Penalty shoot-out if scores still level.
- Maximum of five named substitutes.
- Maximum of three substitutions.

A-League
2013 Champions

Central Coast Mariners
First Title

=== Statistics ===
	Western Sydney Wanderers	Central Coast Mariners
Goals Scored	0	2
Total Shots	4	14
Shots on Target	1	5
Ball Possession	55%	45%
Corner Kicks	5	6
Fouls Committed	6	12
Offsides	2	0
Yellow Cards	0	2
Second Caution Red Cards	0	0
Direct Red Cards	0	0

== See also ==
- 2012–13 A-League
- List of A-League champions
