= Iacopo La Rocca =

Italian-Australian soccer player and coach

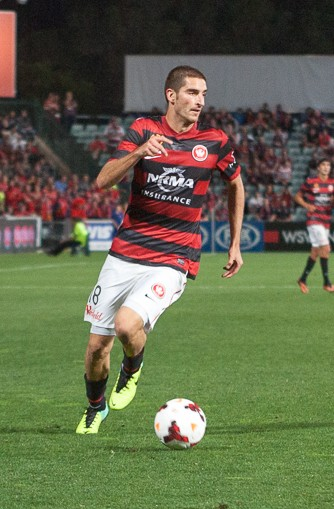
- La Rocca playing for Western Sydney Wanderers in 2013

Personal information
- Full name: Iacopo La Rocca
- Date of birth: 17 February 1984 (age 42)
- Place of birth: Rome, Italy
- Height: 1.88 m (6 ft 2 in)
- Positions: Defensive midfielder; central defender

Team information
- Current team: Brisbane Roar (assistant)

Senior career*
Years	Team	Apps	(Gls)
2001–2004	Pro Vercelli	36	(1)
2004–2005	Chieti	1	(0)
2005–2006	Fermana	8	(1)
2006–2007	Sassari Torres	5	(0)
2007–2011	AC Bellinzona	89	(3)
2011–2012	Grasshopper	19	(0)
2012–2015	Western Sydney Wanderers	58	(6)
2015–2017	Adelaide United	30	(0)
2017–2019	Melbourne City	20	(0)
Total		266	(11)

Managerial career
- 2019–2023: Melbourne City FC U14,U17,U23
- 2023–2024: Preston Lions FC U23
- 2026: FC Bulleen Lions
- 2026–: Brisbane Roar (assistant)
- * Club domestic league appearances and goals as of 13 May 2019

Iacopo La Rocca (born 17 February 1984) is an Italian-Australian association football coach and former professional player who played as a defensive midfielder or central defender. He was the recent head coach for FC Bulleen Lions and is the current assistant coach for Brisbane Roar.

== Club career ==
La Rocca started his youth career at Lazio, before moving to his first club, Pro Vercelli. He signed a 3-year deal with Treviso.

He joined various clubs on loan from Treviso Italy, such as Chieti, Fermana, Sassari Torres, but he was unlucky with injuries and then moved to Switzerland, where he joined AC Bellinzona for four years, where he won the Challenge League and he played the Final Swiss Cup against Basel. After 4 years in the Super League, where he also played 6 games in the UEFA Cup, he joined Swiss Super League club Grasshopper.

On 11 September 2012, he signed a one-year deal with A-League club Western Sydney Wanderers. La Rocca scored his first goal for Western Sydney Wanderers on 18 November 2012 in just his second game, to defeat Perth Glory. In February 2013, he signed a new two-year deal with the Wanderers.

On 23 March, La Rocca was sent off in the last minute of stoppage time in the third Sydney Derby of the season for elbowing Sydney midfielder Terry Antonis in the temple. The subsequent ban meant La Rocca missed the semifinal and the final. His club nonetheless won the title in their debut season. In 2013, he played the Grand Final, got the man of the match with Broich and won the Joe Marston Medal, but Western Sydney Wanderers lost in extra time 2–1; the year after, he won the 2014 AFC Champions League, with La Rocca starting both legs of their triumph over Al-Hilal in the final and became the first Italian to win that trophy.

At the 2014 FIFA Club World Cup in Morocco, La Rocca opened the scoring against Cruz Azul of Mexico in an eventual 1–3 loss after extra time.

In June 2015, La Rocca signed a two-year contract with Adelaide United. After overcoming injury, he featured heavily for Adelaide in the second half of the season and played a crucial role in the central defensive position along with teammate Dylan McGowan in the club's successful attempt at the Premier's Plate and inaugural Championship title.

In November 2016, La Rocca became an Australian citizen, allowing him to be called up to the Australian national team and to be considered a domestic player for his club.

Melbourne City announced the signing of La Rocca on 15 July 2017 on a 2-year deal. La Rocca played his first official game with Melbourne City on 13 September 2017 in the FFA Cup against Sydney FC.

Following his retirement in 2019, he began his journey as a coach by acquiring the UEFA B License in Italy. In 2023, he obtained the UEFA A License in Coverciano, Italy.

== Career statistics ==
=== Club ===
Appearances and goals by club, season and competition
Club	Season	League			Cup		Continental		Other		Total	
Club	Season	Division	Apps	Goals	Apps	Goals	Apps	Goals	Apps	Goals	Apps	Goals
Pro Vercelli	2002–03	Serie C2	1	0	—		—		—		1	0
Pro Vercelli	2003–04	Serie C2	13	0	—		—		—		13	0
Pro Vercelli	2004–05	Serie C2	22	1	—		—		1	0	23	1
Pro Vercelli	Total		36	1	—		—		1	0	37	1
Chieti	2004–05	Serie C1	1	0	—		—		0	0	1	0
Fermana	2005–06	Serie C1	8	1	—		—		—		8	1
Sassari Torres	2006–07	Serie C2	5	0	—		—		—		5	0
AC Bellinzona	2007–08	Swiss Challenge League	25	1	5	0	—		2	0	32	1
AC Bellinzona	2008–09	Swiss Super League	27	2	2	0	6	2	—		35	4
AC Bellinzona	2009–10	Swiss Super League	25	0	1	0	—		2	0	28	0
AC Bellinzona	2010–11	Swiss Super League	12	0	2	0	—		2	0	23	0
AC Bellinzona	Total		89	3	10	0	6	2	6	0	111	5
Grasshopper	2011–12	Swiss Super League	19	0	3	0	—		—		22	0
Western Sydney Wanderers	2012–13	A-League	20	3	—		—		—		20	3
Western Sydney Wanderers	2013–14	A-League	20	2	—		7	0	—		27	2
Western Sydney Wanderers	2014–15	A-League	18	1	0	0	11	1	1	1	30	3
Western Sydney Wanderers	Total		58	6	0	0	18	1	1	1	77	8
Adelaide United	2015–16	A-League	12	0	1	0	—		—		13	0
Adelaide United	2016–17	A-League	18	0	0	0	0	0	—		18	0
Adelaide United	Total		30	0	1	0	0	0	—		31	0
Melbourne City	2017–18	A-League	12	0	1	0	—		—		13	0
Melbourne City	2018–19	A-League	8	0	0	0	—		—		8	0
Melbourne City	Total		20	0	1	0	—		—		21	0
Career total			266	11	20	0	24	3	8	1	318	15

== Honours ==
=== Club ===
Western Sydney Wanderers

- A-League Premiers: 2012–13
- AFC Champions League: 2014

Adelaide United FC

- A-League Premiers: 2015–16
- A-League Championship: 2015–16

=== Individual ===
- Joe Marston Medal: 2014 (shared with Thomas Broich)
