= John Irving (footballer, born 1988) =

English footballer

Personal information
- Full name: John Goodison Irving
- Date of birth: 17 September 1988 (age 38)
- Place of birth: Portsmouth, England
- Height: 1.73 m (5 ft 8 in)
- Position: Defender

Youth career
- 1995–2006: Everton

Senior career*
Years	Team	Apps	(Gls)
2006–2009	Everton	0	(0)
2009–2013	Bala Town	109	(3)
2013–2015	Auckland City	23	(1)
2015–2017	Bala Town	46	(2)

International career
2003	England U-16	1	(0)
- * Club domestic league appearances and goals as of 6 January 2019

John Goodison Irving (born 17 September 1988) is an English former footballer who played as a defender.

== Career ==
=== Everton ===
Born in Portsmouth then moved to Liverpool aged 2, Irving began his career at hometown club Everton in 1995. On 20 December 2007, he was named in the matchday squad for a 3–2 win at AZ Alkmaar in the UEFA Cup group stage after Everton had already advanced, but never played a competitive match.

=== Bala Town ===
Irving then moved to Bala Town of the Welsh Premier League, where he made 109 top-flight appearances across four seasons becoming their longest serving player, scoring 3 league goals. On 18 May 2013, in his final game for Bala, Irving scored the winner three minutes from time in the UEFA Europa League Play-off game against Port Talbot Town, which resulted in his team qualifying for their first ever European match, a year after losing the same fixture to Llanelli Town.

=== Auckland City ===
In 2013, Irving moved to New Zealand and joined semi-professional side Auckland City, freshly crowned champions of Oceania. At the 2013 FIFA Club World Cup in Morocco, he played the first 86 minutes of their 1–2 defeat to Raja Casablanca in the opening game at the Stade Adrar in Agadir.

Irving played all of Auckland's 7 matches as they won the 2013–14 OFC Champions League, concluding with a 3–2 aggregate win over Amicale in the final. At the year's Club World Cup, again in Morocco, he scored a penalty as Auckland defeated Moghreb Tétouan in a shootout in the opening game in Rabat. At the same stadium in the quarter-final on 13 December, he scored the winning goal against ES Sétif to get Auckland to the semi-finals in a man of the match performance, getting Auckland City to the furthest point they have ever reached in the FIFA Club World Cup. In the match for third place against Cruz Azul, Irving missed in the shootout when he struck the crossbar, but Auckland nonetheless won the bronze medal.

=== Return to Bala Town ===
In 2015, Irving returned to Bala. On 25 February 2017, he scored in a 3–0 win over Cymru Alliance team Guilsfield to put the club in the Welsh Cup semi-finals. He also played in the final, a 2–1 win over reigning champions The New Saints on 30 April at Nantporth.

== Honours ==
Auckland City

- New Zealand Football Championship: 2013–14, 2014–15
- OFC Champions League: 2013–14, 2014–15
- FIFA Club World Cup third place: 2014

Bala Town

- Welsh Cup: 2016–17
