= Youssouf Hersi =

Footballer (born 1982)

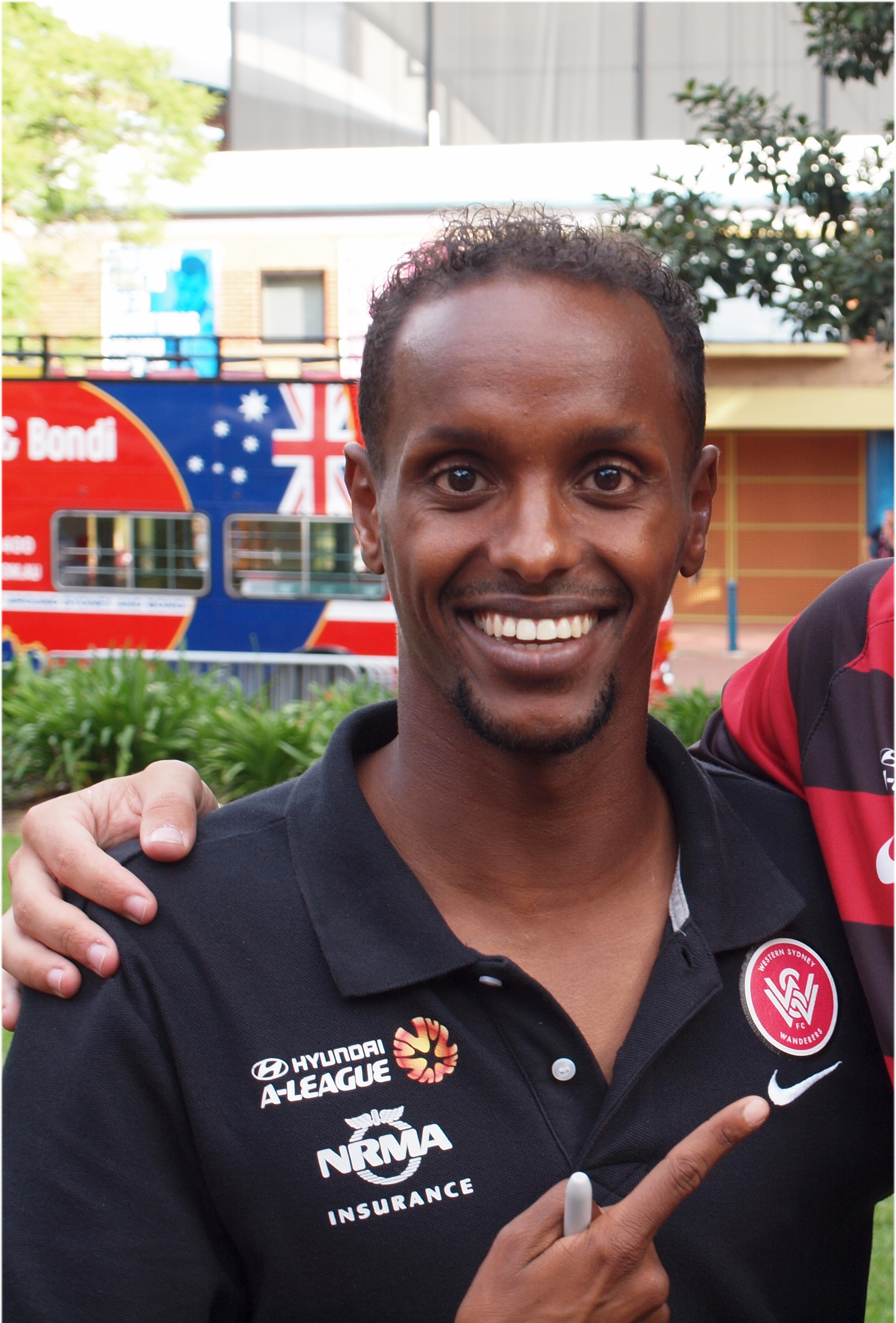
- Hersi with the Western Sydney Wanderers

Personal information
- Date of birth: 20 August 1982 (age 44)
- Place of birth: Dire Dawa, Ethiopia
- Position: Attacking midfielder

Youth career
- SCD '83

Senior career*
Years	Team	Apps	(Gls)
2000–2001	Ajax	9	(0)
2001–2002	NAC	33	(3)
2002–2004	NEC	61	(19)
2004–2005	Heerenveen	9	(0)
2005–2007	Vitesse	69	(15)
2007–2009	Twente	46	(8)
2009–2010	AEK Athens	21	(1)
2010–2011	De Graafschap	22	(2)
2012–2014	Western Sydney Wanderers	47	(8)
2014–2015	Perth Glory	8	(0)
Total		325	(56)

International career
1997-1998	Netherlands U16	8	(4)
1998	Netherlands U17	7	(6)
1999	Netherlands U18	1	(0)
1999–2001	Netherlands U19	27	(14)
2001–2003	Netherlands U21	14	(5)
- * Club domestic league appearances and goals

Youssouf Hersi (born 20 August 1982) is a retired professional footballer who played as an attacking midfielder. Born in Ethiopia, Hersi represented the Netherlands at youth international level.

== Club career ==
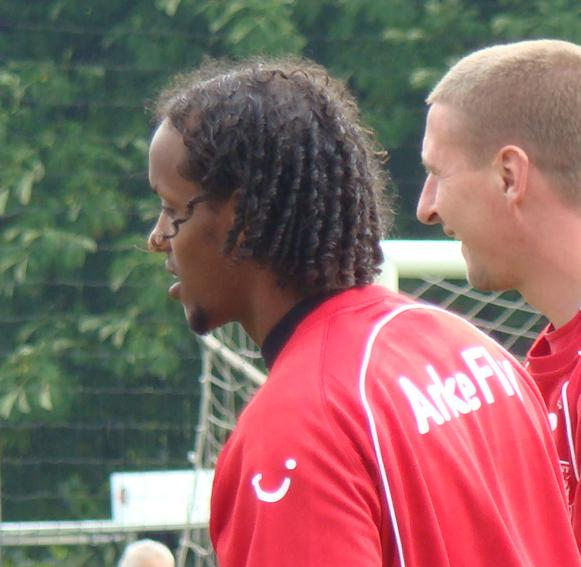
Hersi with FC Twente

Hersi came as a refugee to the Netherlands at age 7, ending up in a asylum seekers' center in Slagharen. When his family were assigned a house in Dedemsvaart, he started playing football for local amateur side SCD '83.

He then played professionally in the Netherlands for Ajax, NAC Breda, NEC, Heerenveen, Vitesse, Twente and De Graafschap. He also played for the Greek side AEK Athens.

On 11 September 2012, Hersi signed with A-League club Western Sydney Wanderers. He scored his first goal for the club in the Sydney Derby on 15 December 2012. In February 2013, Hersi re-signed with the Wanderers for another season. On 10 March 2013, against Wellington Phoenix Hersi broke the Australian football record for most consecutive wins for a player (14) beating Matt Horsley's 13 wins for the Wollongong Wolves from April to December 2001. Hersi was sent off with a second yellow card in the Wanderers' Grand Final qualifier against Brisbane Roar and subsequently missed the 2013 A-League Grand Final in which the Wanderers lost 2–0 to Central Coast Mariners.

In May 2014 Hersi signed with Perth Glory. He requested a release from the club in May 2015, which was granted despite having another year to run on his contract.

Hersi was set to sign for the Central Coast Mariners in February 2016, but the deal was scuppered at the last minute after he travelled to Australia on the wrong type of visa.

== International career ==
Hersi played with the Dutch under-21 team at the 2001 FIFA World Youth Championship and totalled 14 matches for the team. He also played for the U19s.

He was never capped for the Dutch full national side, although he had expressed an interest in representing the nation of his birth Ethiopia at the international level,

== Career statistics ==
Appearances and goals by club, season and competition
Club	Season	League			Cup		Continental		Other		Total	
Club	Season	Division	Apps	Goals	Apps	Goals	Apps	Goals	Apps	Goals	Apps	Goals
Ajax	2000–01	Eredivisie	9	0	0	0	0	0	—		9	0
NAC Breda	2001–02	Eredivisie	33	3	0	0	—		—		33	3
NEC	2002–03	Eredivisie	30	9	2	1	—		—		32	10
NEC	2003–04	Eredivisie	31	10	2	1	2	0	—		35	11
NEC	Total		61	19	4	2	2	0	0	0	67	21
Heerenveen	2004–05	Eredivisie	9	0	—		0	0	—		9	0
Vitesse	2004–05	Eredivisie	17	1	—		—		—		17	1
Vitesse	2005–06	Eredivisie	25	10	0	0	—		5	3	30	13
Vitesse	2006–07	Eredivisie	27	4	0	0	—		1	1	28	4
Vitesse	Total		69	15	0	0	0	0	6	4	75	19
Twente	2007–08	Eredivisie	25	7	0	0	1	0	4	1	30	8
Twente	2008–09	Eredivisie	21	1	6	2	4	0	—		31	3
Twente	Total		46	8	6	2	5	0	4	1	61	11
AEK Athens	2009–10	Super League Greece	21	1	1	0	4	0	—		26	1
De Graafschap	2010–11	Eredivisie	22	2	0	0	—		—		22	2
Western Sydney Wanderers	2012–13	A-League	23	5	—		—		—		23	5
Western Sydney Wanderers	2013–14	A-League	24	3	—		5	0	—		29	3
Western Sydney Wanderers	Total		47	8	0	0	5	0	0	0	52	8
Perth Glory	2014–15	A-League	8	0	2	0	—		—		10	0
Career total			325	56	13	4	16	0	10	5	364	65
