= Adam D'Apuzzo =

Australian soccer player

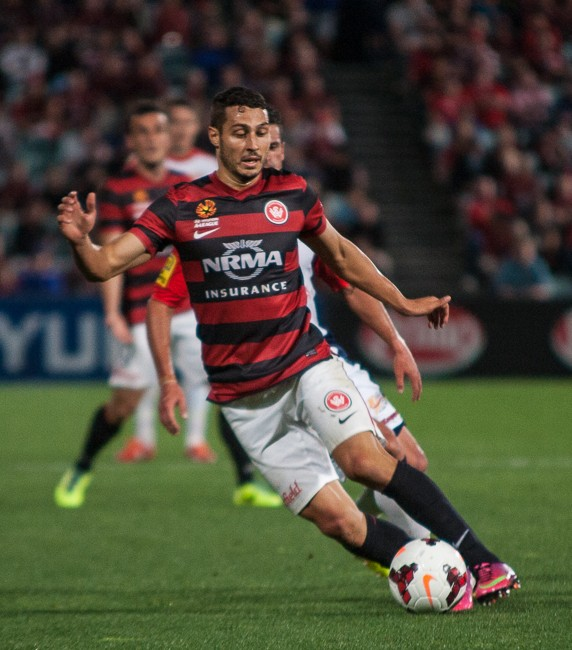
- D'Apuzzo playing for Western Sydney Wanderers in 2013

Personal information
- Full name: Adam Leonard D'Apuzzo
- Date of birth: 20 October 1986 (age 40)
- Place of birth: Sydney, New South Wales, Australia
- Height: 1.80 m (5 ft 11 in)
- Positions: Left back; central midfielder

Youth career
- St George Saints
- Sydney Olympic
- NSWIS
- Marconi Stallions

Senior career*
Years	Team	Apps	(Gls)
2005–2006	Marconi Stallions	26	(2)
2006–2011	Newcastle Jets	102	(0)
2011–2012	APIA Leichhardt Tigers	26	(0)
2012–2014	Western Sydney Wanderers	48	(0)
2015	APIA Leichhardt Tigers	4	(0)
Total		206	(2)

International career^{‡}
2007–2008	Australia U23	11	(0)
- * Club domestic league appearances and goals as of 16 September 2015 ‡ National team caps and goals as of 12 November 2010

Adam Leonard D'Apuzzo (born 20 October 1986) is a retired Australian association football player who played as a left-back. He retired from professional football following his release from Western Sydney Wanderers.

== Biography ==
He has previously played for the Marconi Stallions in the NSW Premier League competition. D'Apuzzo's brother is former Central Coast Mariners midfielder David D'Apuzzo. D'Apuzzo attended Trinity Grammar School in Summer Hill, Sydney, Australia with his brother and former Sydney FC striker Ben Vidaic. He was the captain of the football team. D'Apuzzo also studies commerce, majoring in finance and accounting, at the University of NSW.

=== Newcastle Jets ===
He signed a contract with the Newcastle Jets in 2006. He made his debut for the first team squad on 1 September 2006 against the Queensland Roar at Energy Australia Stadium. In his first season, he played 11 games and scored 1 goal. He became a regular at left back. On 18 February 2011 it was announced that he would leave the club and return to his home town of Sydney. He played over 102 games for the Jets over 5 years with the club. He trialed with Sydney FC on his return to Sydney.

=== APIA Leichhardt ===
On 20 June 2011, it was announced that he had signed for APIA Leichhardt Tigers in the NSW Premier League until the remainder of the 2011 season.

=== Western Sydney Wanderers ===
D'Apuzzo had effectively retired from professional football, deciding to concentrate on his accounting career, when Tony Popovic offered D'Apuzzo a contract with the newly formed Western Sydney Wanderers. D'Apuzzo earned the starting left fullback position and established himself in the starting 11.

In 2014, he left the Wanderers after not agreeing to terms in a new contractual offer made by the Wanderers in December 2014. Within his two seasons at the club, he made a total of 49 appearances.

== A-League career statistics ==
As of 16 September 2014

Club	Season	League		Cup		Asia^{1}		Total	
Club	Season	Apps	Goals	Apps	Goals	Apps	Goals	Apps	Goals
Newcastle Jets	2006–07	10	0	6	0	–	–	16	0
Newcastle Jets	2007–08	19	0	5	0	–	–	24	0
Newcastle Jets	2008–09	20	0	3	0	6	0	29	0
Newcastle Jets	2009–10	27	0	–	–	–	–	27	0
Newcastle Jets	2010–11	26	0	–	–	–	–	26	0
Newcastle Jets	Total	102	0	14	0	6	0	122	0
Western Sydney Wanderers	2012–13	23	0	–	–	–	–	23	0
Western Sydney Wanderers	2013–14	25	0	–	–	1	0	26	0
Western Sydney Wanderers	Total	48	0	–	–	1	0	49	0
Career total		150	0	14	0	7	0	171	0

^{1} - AFC Champions League statistics are included in season ending during group stages (i.e. ACL 2009 and A-League season 2008–2009 etc.)

== Honours ==
With Newcastle Jets:

- (Australia) A-League Championship: 2007–2008
