= Jerrad Tyson =

Australian soccer player

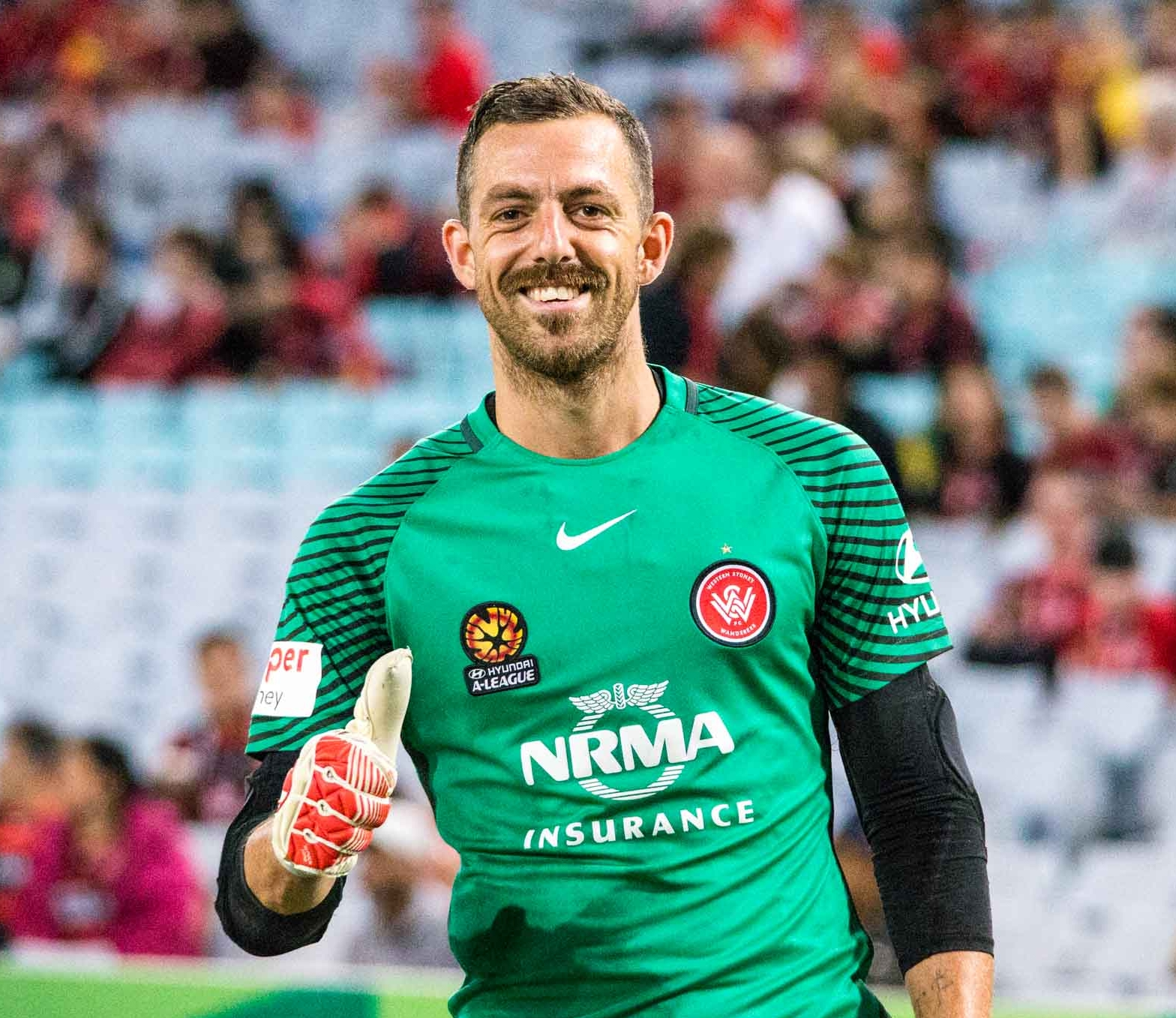
- Tyson playing for Western Sydney Wanderers in 2017

Personal information
- Full name: Jerrad Robert Tyson
- Date of birth: 21 September 1989 (age 37)
- Place of birth: Hobart, Tasmania, Australia
- Height: 1.89 m (6 ft 2 in)
- Position: Goalkeeper

Team information
- Current team: Sunshine Coast FC

Youth career
- 2002–2006: Maroochydore
- 2007: AIS
- 2009–2010: Gold Coast United

Senior career*
Years	Team	Apps	(Gls)
2007	AIS	15	(0)
2008	Sunshine Coast	20	(0)
2009	Brisbane Strikers	8	(0)
2010–2012	Gold Coast United	15	(0)
2010	→ North Queensland Fury (loan)	0	(0)
2011	→ North Queensland Fury (loan)	0	(0)
2012	Olympic FC		
2012–2014	Western Sydney Wanderers	1	(0)
2014–2015	Sun Pegasus	11	(0)
2015–2016	Perth Glory	0	(0)
2016–2018	Western Sydney Wanderers	9	(0)
2018	South Melbourne	6	(0)
2018	Chennai City	0	(0)
2019–2021	Green Gully	49	(0)
2021–2022	Melbourne Victory	0	(0)
2022–	Sunshine Coast FC	18	(0)

International career
2007	Australia U20	1	(0)
2010	Australia U23	1	(0)
- * Club domestic league appearances and goals as of 23 September 2022

Jerrad Robert Tyson is an Australian professional goalkeeper who plays for Queensland club Sunshine Coast FC.

== Club career ==
=== Gold Coast United ===
On 1 December 2010 he made his debut for Gold Coast United against North Queensland Fury. In May 2012 trialled at Sydney FC.

=== Western Sydney Wanderers ===
On 2 August 2012, it was confirmed he had signed with Western Sydney Wanderers. After a season and a half being the back-up goalkeeper, Tyson made his debut against Perth Glory following a groin injury to first goalkeeper Ante Čović and kept a clean sheet.

=== Perth Glory ===
On 24 June 2015, Tyson signed with Perth Glory on a two-year contract. On 18 May 2016, Tyson and Perth Glory mutually terminated his contract after he only made two appearances for the club, both of them in the FFA Cup.

=== Return to Western Sydney Wanderers ===
A day after leaving Perth Glory, Tyson re-joined Western Sydney Wanderers.

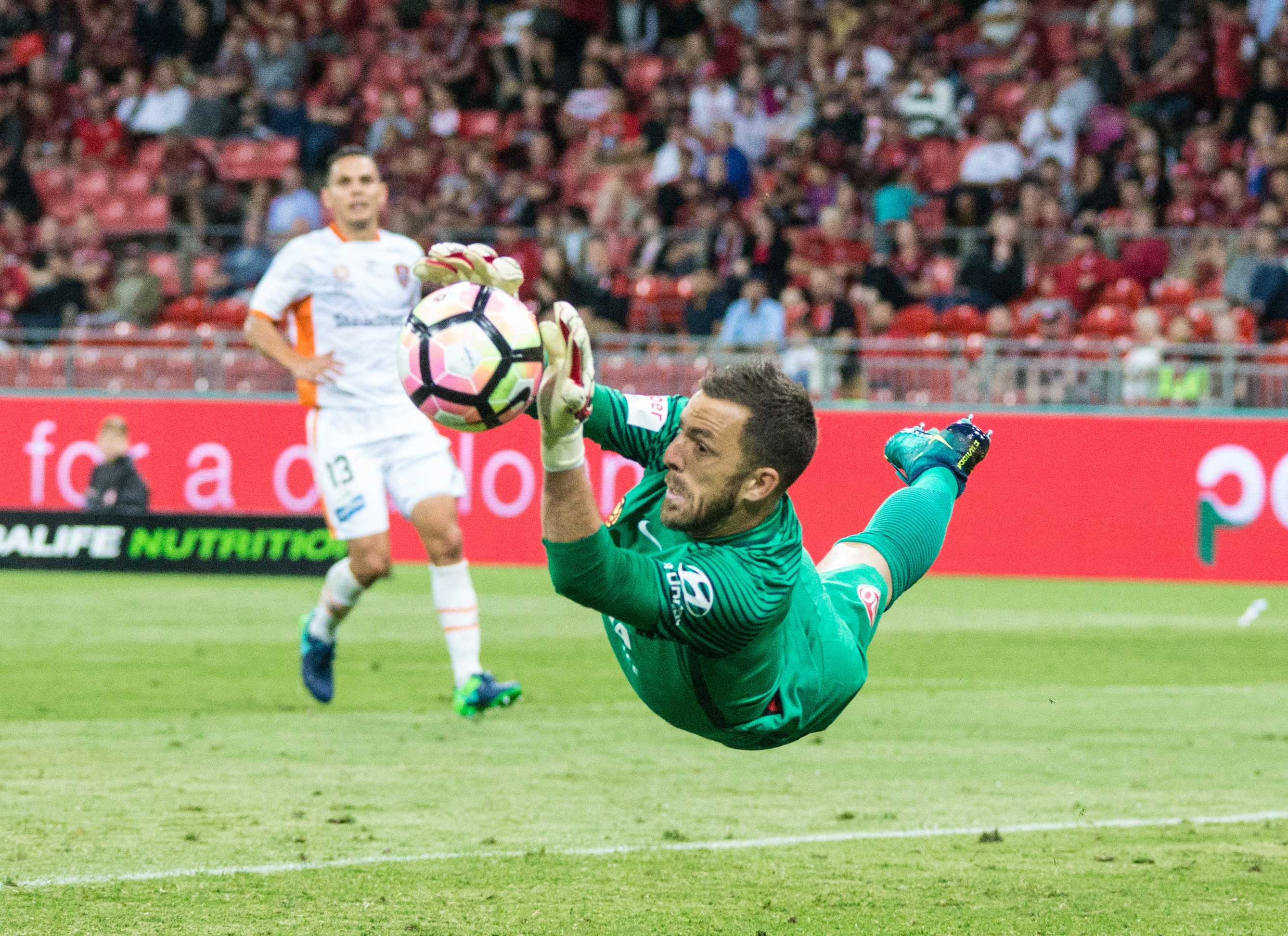
Diving Save

On 12 April 2018, Tyson was released from the Wanderers by mutual consent to pursue further opportunities.

=== NPL Victoria ===
After a short stint with South Melbourne FC in the NPL Victoria, Tyson joined Indian club Chennai City FC on 8 June 2018. However, Tyson left Chennai in November 2018 following a dispute with the club, landing back in NPL Victoria with Green Gully SC for the 2019 season. Tyson spent three seasons at the Keilor Downs based club, although the 2020 and 2021 campaigns were both cancelled mid season due to covid-19 restrictions.

=== Melbourne Victory ===
Tyson returned to the A-Leagues in November 2021, accepting an injury replacement contract with Melbourne Victory. Tyson mainly featured in the club's FFA Cup (now Australia Cup) campaign during this time, starting in three of the six fixtures that lead to the club being crowned Champions.

=== Return to Sunshine Coast FC ===
Victory announced Tyson's departure from his short term deal on 4 January 2022. On 13 January 2022, Sunshine Coast FC announced that Tyson had returned home and re-signed with the club, 14-years after he departed to commence his professional career. Tyson was named club captain to commence the 2022 FQPL1 season and after an impressive campaign was awarded the competitions 'Goalkeeper of the Year'.

== Career statistics ==
As of 18 May 2016

CS = Clean Sheets

Club	Season	Division	League^{1}		Cup		International^{2}		Total	
Club	Season	Division	Apps	CS	Apps	CS	Apps	CS	Apps	CS
AIS	2007	Victorian Premier League	15	6	0	0	0	0	15	6
AIS	Total		15	6	0	0	0	0	15	6
Sunshine Coast	2008	Queensland State League	20	11	0	0	0	0	20	11
Sunshine Coast	Total		20	11	0	0	0	0	20	11
Brisbane Strikers	2009	Queensland State League	8	?	0	0	0	0	8	0
Brisbane Strikers	Total		8	?	0	0	0	0	8	0
Gold Coast United	2009–10	A-League	0	0	–	–	–	–	0	0
Gold Coast United	2010–11	A-League	1	0	–	–	–	–	1	0
Gold Coast United	2011–12	A-League	14	3	–	–	–	–	14	3
Gold Coast United	Total		15	3	–	–	0	0	15	3
Western Sydney Wanderers	2012–13	A-League	0	0	–	–	–	–	0	0
Western Sydney Wanderers	2013–14	A-League	1	1	–	–	2	2	3	3
Western Sydney Wanderers	Total		1	1	–	–	2	2	3	3
Sun Pegasus	2014–15	Hong Kong Premier League	11	3	2	0	–	–	13	3
Sun Pegasus	Total		11	3	2	0	0	0	13	3
Perth Glory	2015–16	A-League	0	0	2	1	–	–	2	1
Perth Glory	Total		0	0	2	1	0	0	2	1
Chennai City	2018–19	I-League	0	0	0	0	–	–	0	0
Chennai City	Total		0	0	2	1	0	0	2	1
Career Total			70	24	4	1	2	2	76	27

^{1} - includes A-League final series statistics
^{2} - AFC Champions League statistics are included in season commencing during group stages (i.e. ACL 2014 and A-League season 2013–14 etc.)

== Honours ==
Australia

- Australian Youth Olympic Festival Bronze Medal: 2007
- Weifang Cup (U-18) Champions: 2007

Gold Coast United

- National Youth League Championship: 2009–10

Melbourne Victory

- FFA Cup Champions: 2021

Sunshine Coast FC

- FQPL1 Goalkeeper of the Year: 2022
- FQPL1 Team of the Season: 2022
