= Reece Caira =

Australian soccer player

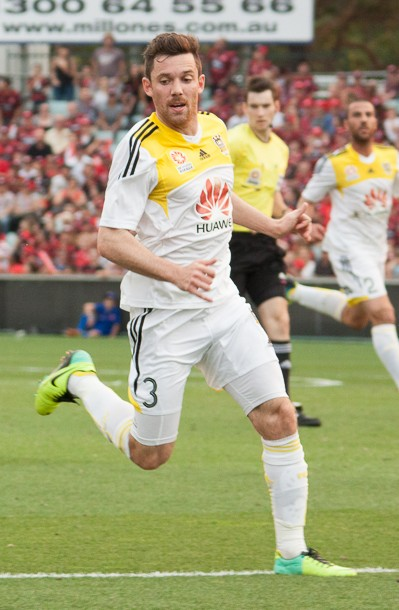
- Reece Caira playing for Wellington Phoenix in 2013

Personal information
- Full name: Reece Caira
- Date of birth: 7 January 1993 (age 33)
- Place of birth: Gosford, Australia
- Height: 1.68 m (5 ft 6 in)
- Position: Left back

Team information
- Current team: Berkeley Vale Wombats

Youth career
- Wyoming Tigers
- 2009: Blacktown City
- 2009–2012: Aston Villa

Senior career*
Years	Team	Apps	(Gls)
2012–2013	Western Sydney Wanderers	2	(0)
2013–2014	Wellington Phoenix	11	(0)
2015	Bonnyrigg White Eagles	18	(1)
2016	Gosford City		
2017	Valentine Phoenix	5	(0)
2018	Gosford City		
2019–	Berkeley Vale Wombats		

International career^{‡}
2011–2013	Australia U-20	10	(1)
2014	Australia U-23	2	(0)
- * Club domestic league appearances and goals as of 25 September 2017 ‡ National team caps and goals as of 17 October 2014

Reece Caira is an Australian semi-professional footballer who plays as a left back for Berkeley Vale in the Premier League Central Coast, a regional league within the Australian soccer league system. Caira has previously played professionally as a youth player for Aston Villa and as a senior for Western Sydney Wanderers, Wellington Phoenix and Bonnyrigg White Eagles. In 2017 he played for Valentine Phoenix as a short-term signing to boost their bid for the NSW Finals. Caira has represented Australia at a number of youth levels and was part of the 2012 AFC U-19 Championship squad that reached the semi-finals of that tournament.

== Career ==
Caira had been part of Premier League team Aston Villa's youth development program before he was recruited to the Western Sydney Wanderers, transferring after one season to the Wellington Phoenix in July 2013.

== Personal life ==
Caira works as a real estate agent in New South Wales alongside his football.

== Honours ==
=== Club ===
Western Sydney Wanderers

- A-League Premiership: 2012–13

Bonnyrigg White Eagles

- National Premier Leagues NSW Championship: 2015

== See also ==
- List of Wellington Phoenix FC players
- List of Western Sydney Wanderers FC players
