= Joey Gibbs =

Australian soccer player (born 1992)

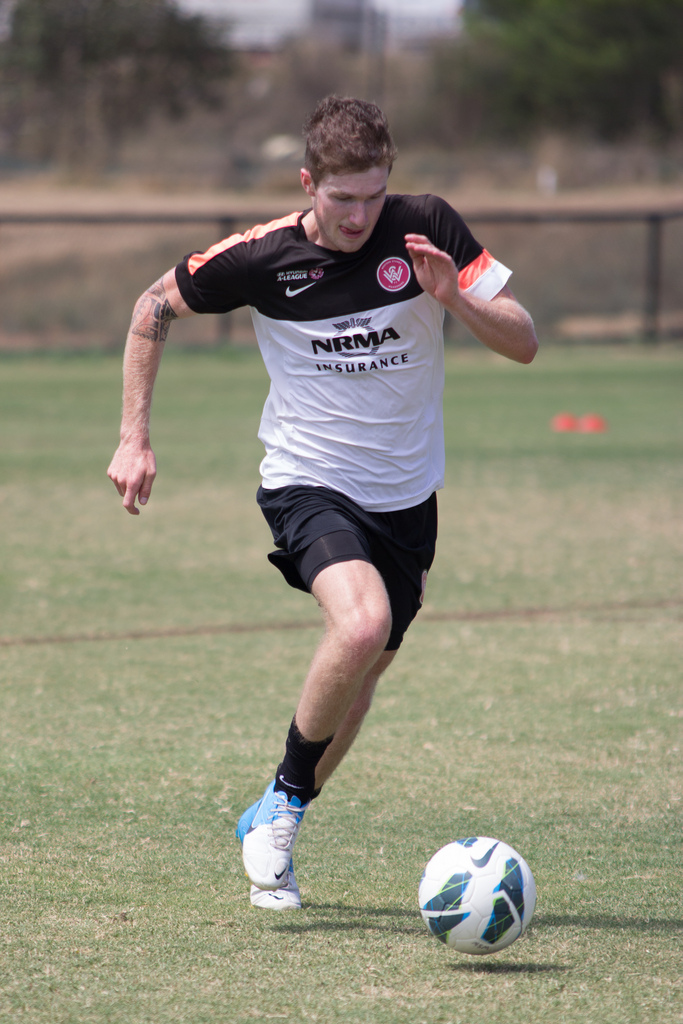
- Western Sydney Wanderers forward Joey Gibbs at training, 2012

Personal information
- Full name: Joseph Arthur Gibbs
- Date of birth: 13 June 1992 (age 34)
- Place of birth: Gosford, Australia
- Height: 1.73 m (5 ft 8 in)
- Position: Striker

Team information
- Current team: Gosford City
- Number: 10

Youth career
- Manly United
- 2008–2010: Sydney FC
- 2011–2012: Sydney FC

Senior career*
Years	Team	Apps	(Gls)
2009	Manly United	14	(0)
2010	Sydney FC	1	(0)
2010	Manly United	11	(0)
2010–2011	Olympic Charleroi	0	(0)
2011	Manly United	21	(3)
2012	Marconi Stallions	25	(12)
2012–2013	Western Sydney Wanderers	13	(2)
2013–2014	Newcastle Jets		(1)
2014	APIA Leichhardt	8	(1)
2014	Tai Po	7	(1)
2015–2020	Blacktown City	113	(43)
2020–2022	Keflavík	62	(46)
2023	Stjarnan	16	(2)
2024	Blacktown City	27	(11)
2025	Mt Druitt Town Rangers	9	(1)
2026–	Gosford City	16	(14)
- * Club domestic league appearances and goals as of 6 May 2026

Joseph Arthur Gibbs (born 13 June 1992) is an Australian soccer player who plays for Gosford City in the Central Coast Premier League.

== Career ==
Gibbs made his senior A-League debut as a substitute for Sydney FC in the 2010 Grand Final against the Melbourne Victory. He was the youngest player to play in an A-League grand final. It was reported that he had signed for Olympic Charleroi in the Belgian Third Division B.

After his stint in Belgium, Gibbs returned to Australia where he signed with his former NSW Premier League club Manly United for the 2011 season.

He played for the Marconi Stallions in the NSW Premier League for the duration of the 2012 season where he was selected in team of the season and helped Marconi to win the Australian state league grand final.

Joey Gibbs came on as a substitute in Western Sydney's first official game, where he achieved an impressive 4 goals in one half. On 3 October 2012, just three days before their first match of the season, Gibbs signed a one-year deal with new A-League club Western Sydney Wanderers. He was released by the Wanderers along with Dino Kresinger, Tarek Elrich, and Rocky Visconte at the conclusion of the 2012–13 A-League season.

On 13 May 2013, Gibbs signed with the Newcastle Jets for the 2013/14 season. In his debut for the Newcastle Jets, he came on in the 88th minute and his first touch was a goal.

In early 2014, he joined APIA Leichhardt in the National Premier Leagues NSW, before making a move to Hong Kong Premier League side Tai Po FC.

Gibbs returned to Australia to join Blacktown City FC for the 2015 season.

Gibbs signed with Icelandic side Stjarnan in December 2022.

In December 2023, Gibbs returned to Australia and rejoined Blacktown City for the 2024 NPL NSW season.

== Achievements ==
Gibbs was the recipient of the 2008 Lucas Neill scholarship award.

== Honours ==
Sydney FC

- A-League Championship: 2009–10

Manly United

- Waratah Cup: 2011

Marconi Stallions

- National Premier Leagues NSW Championship: 2012

Blacktown City

- National Premier Leagues: 2015
- National Premier Leagues NSW Championship: 2016
- National Premier Leagues NSW Premiership: 2015

Keflavík

- 1. deild karla: 2020

Individual

- John Kosmina Medal: 2015
- 1. deild karla top-goalscorer: 2020
