= Rocky Visconte =

Australian soccer player (born 1990)

Personal information
- Full name: Rocco Joseph Visconte
- Date of birth: 22 April 1990 (age 36)
- Place of birth: Adelaide, Australia
- Height: 1.78 m (5 ft 10 in)
- Position: Left winger

Team information
- Current team: Cumberland United

Youth career
- –2005: Croydon Kings
- 2006–2009: Heart of Midlothian

Senior career*
Years	Team	Apps	(Gls)
2005	Croydon Kings	10	(0)
2009–2010	Heart of Midlothian	2	(0)
2010	→ Ayr United (loan)	3	(0)
2010–2013	Brisbane Roar	24	(2)
2013	Western Sydney Wanderers	3	(1)
2013	Croydon Kings	2	(2)
2013	Suphanburi	5	(0)
2014–2018	Croydon Kings	119	(36)
2018–2020	Adelaide Raiders	25	(3)
2020–2021	Croydon Kings	4	(0)
2021–	Cumberland United	56	(2)

International career
2005	Australia U-17	13	(2)
2007–2009	Australia U-20	21	(5)
2011	Australia U-23	9	(0)
- * Club domestic league appearances and goals as of 13 September 2023

Rocky Visconte (born 22 April 1990) is an Australian footballer who plays as a left winger for Cumberland United.

== Club career ==
=== Croydon Kings ===
In 2005, Visconte made his first senior appearance for local South Australian Premier League club Croydon Kings. He went on the make 10 appearances.

=== Hearts ===
On 19 September 2006 Visconte was signed by Heart of Midlothian on a three-year contract along with fellow Australian Ryan McGowan, after impressing then Hearts youth coach, Darren Murray, in a trial.

On 9 January 2010, he made his first team debut for Hearts against Aberdeen, as the starting left fullback in the fourth round of the Scottish Cup. Visconte then made his first appearance as a substitute in the 3–0 home defeat to Aberdeen. Visconte's first league debut came away to St Johnstone in Jim Jefferies first game back in charge.

=== Ayr United ===
On 3 February 2010, he was loaned out by Hearts to second division club, Ayr United, joining Ryan McGowan who was also on loan. The move was initiated to find regular game time.

=== Brisbane Roar ===
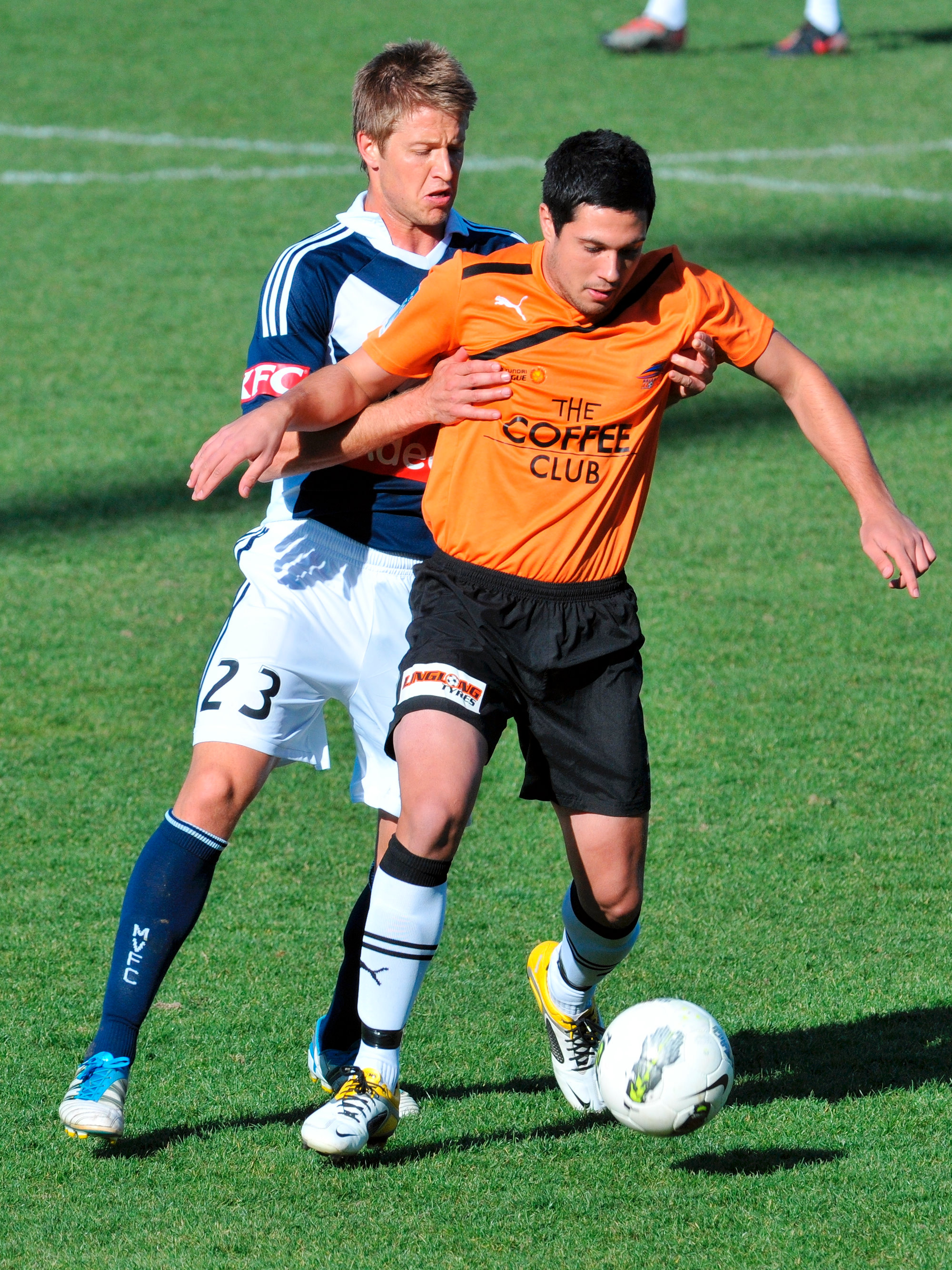
Visconte playing for Brisbane Roar in 2011

On 6 May 2010, after turning down a new Hearts contract, Visconte returned home to Australia to sign with A-League club Brisbane Roar. Visconte was given the number 14 for Brisbane. He scored 2 goals for the team in three seasons, playing 24 games, starting 7 and playing a total of 808 minutes. On 8 January 2013, Brisbane Roar announced that they had mutually agreed with Visconte to terminate his contract effective immediately.

=== Western Sydney Wanderers ===
Following his mutual termination he began negotiations with Western Sydney Wanderers FC, joining the club on 9 January on a short-term contract. Visconte, along with teammates Tarek Elrich, Joey Gibbs and Dino Kresinger were released by the Wanderers at the conclusion of the 2012–13 A-League season.

== Personal life ==
On 9 April 2010, Visconte was robbed at knife-point by a gang of three men near Fountain Park in Edinburgh and was robbed of £300.

== Honors ==
=== Club ===
With Brisbane Roar:

- A-League Premiership: 2010–11
- A-League Championship: 2010–11, 2011–12

With Western Sydney Wanderers:

- A-League Premiership: 2012–13

=== Individual ===
- Sergio Melta Award- South Australian First Division Best and Fairest: 2014
