= Michael Beauchamp =

Australian soccer player (born 1981)

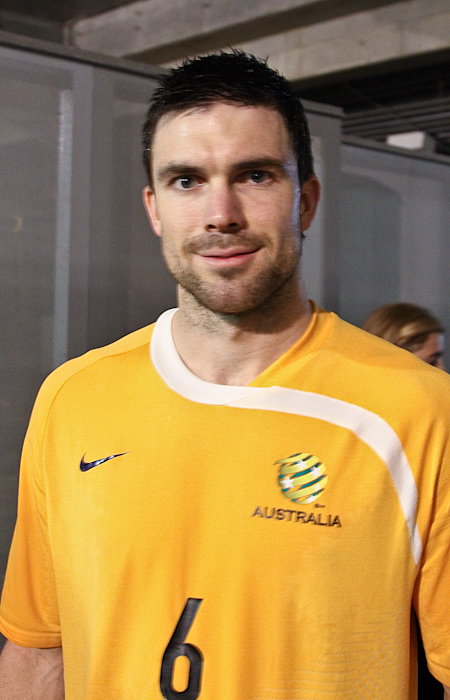
- Beauchamp with Australia in 2009

Personal information
- Full name: Michael Francis Beauchamp
- Date of birth: 8 March 1981 (age 45)
- Place of birth: Sydney, New South Wales, Australia
- Height: 6 ft 3 in (1.91 m)
- Position: Central defender

Youth career
- Marconi Stallions

Senior career*
Years	Team	Apps	(Gls)
2000–2002	Marconi Stallions	26	(0)
2002–2004	Parramatta Power	57	(0)
2004	Sydney Olympic	3	(0)
2005–2007	Central Coast Mariners	22	(0)
2006–2007	→ 1. FC Nürnberg (loan)	18	(1)
2007–2008	1. FC Nürnberg	12	(0)
2008–2009	Aalborg	12	(1)
2009–2010	Al-Jazira	13	(0)
2010–2011	Melbourne Heart	23	(0)
2011–2012	Sydney FC	28	(1)
2012–2014	Western Sydney Wanderers	37	(2)
2014	PTT Rayong	10	(1)
2015–2016	Bankstown City	49	(4)
2017–2018	Marconi Stallions	47	(2)
Total		357	(12)

International career
2004	Australia U-23	1	(0)
2006–2010	Australia	22	(1)
- * Club domestic league appearances and goals

Michael Francis Beauchamp (born 8 March 1981) is an Australian former professional soccer player who played as a central defender. He was a member of the Australian 2006 and 2010 FIFA World Cup squads. At club level, Beauchamp played for football clubs in Germany, Denmark, the United Arab Emirates, and Thailand, as well as in Australia.

== Early life ==
Born in Sydney, New South Wales, Australia, Beauchamp grew up in Wakeley in Sydney's south-west, and attended Westfields Sports High School until year 8, aged 14.

During his first stint with Marconi, Beauchamp made a living laying vinyl flooring.

== Club career ==
After leaving the widely accepted system of progression in Australian youth football, Beauchamp started his career as a part-time professional at age 20 with the Marconi Stallions. Beauchamp appeared just once for the Stallions in his first season, fighting for a spot ahead of Australian representative Mark Babic. In 2001–02, Beauchamp became a regular in the team, making 24 appearances, including 19 starts as Marconi finished ninth in the league. Upon signing with Parramatta Power for 2002–03 and beyond, Beauchamp was able to quit his vinyl-laying job to play football full-time, and became a permanent member of the Parramatta starting line-up. Beauchamp played 33 matches for Parramatta in 2002–03, with the Power finishing the regular season third before coming fourth in the finals series "round-robin". Beauchamp made a further 24 appearances in 2003–04, including the last NSL Grand Final after the western Sydney club finished second in the league. The collapse of the NSL forced Beauchamp to move back to the New South Wales Premier League, where he played for Sydney Olympic FC during the 2004–05 season before signing with A-League club Central Coast Mariners.

=== Central Coast Mariners ===
Beauchamp was a key player for the Mariners in the inaugural A-League season, starting 22 times in central defence. The Mariners finished third and progressed to the Grand Final, with Beauchamp playing the full 90 minutes in the decider. Beauchamp received numerous accolades from the press and fans for his impressive season, chosen as "Player of the Year" by Australian football magazine FourFourTwo, and was the most popular selection in the A-League "Fans' Team of the Year", although he was ineligible for the Johnny Warren Medal after receiving a red card in a round 11 clash with Sydney FC. Beauchamp also collected the inaugural "Mariners Medal" after being voted as the most outstanding Central Coast player by his teammates.

=== Europe ===
At the end of the season Beauchamp travelled to Germany to trial with 1. FC Nürnberg alongside Mariners teammate Dean Heffernan, with both players signing one-year loan contracts with the Bundesliga club. Beauchamp began training with Nürnberg shortly after the end of the World Cup, and scored a goal in his first match for the club, a 3–2 win over FSV Erlangen-Bruck. Beauchamp made his first Bundesliga start for Nürnberg on 4 November 2006 in a 2–1 loss away to Hertha Berlin. He has since become a regular of the starting first team, occasionally coming off the bench. He scored his first goal against Energie Cottbus on 18 February 2007. At the end of the 2006–07 season, 1. FCN elected to sign Beauchamp on a full contract.

In the summer of 2008, Beauchamp moved to Danish champions AaB Football. On 17 August, in his first match in the Danish league, he was shown a straight red card 18 minutes into the game. Precisely one month later he was sent off once more in a UEFA Champions League match against Celtic in Glasgow, though on this occasion it was actually his team-mate Michael Jakobsen who should have received the red card as Beauchamp was not involved in the foul that led to the decision.

=== Melbourne Heart ===
Beauchamp signed a two-year deal with Melbourne Heart on 17 May 2010, returning to the A-League following a four-year stint in Europe. He was the sixteenth player to pledge his future to John van 't Schip's new side. He featured 23 times for the club, including nineteen starts, in its inaugural season. He struggled to cement a position in the starting team due to the good form of younger teammate Michael Marrone.

=== Sydney FC ===
On 20 April 2011, it was announced that Beauchamp had signed for Sydney FC on a multi-year contract. He had been released a year early from his contract with the Melbourne Heart for the move to take place. He also joins Jamie Coyne who moved from Perth Glory.

=== Western Sydney Wanderers ===
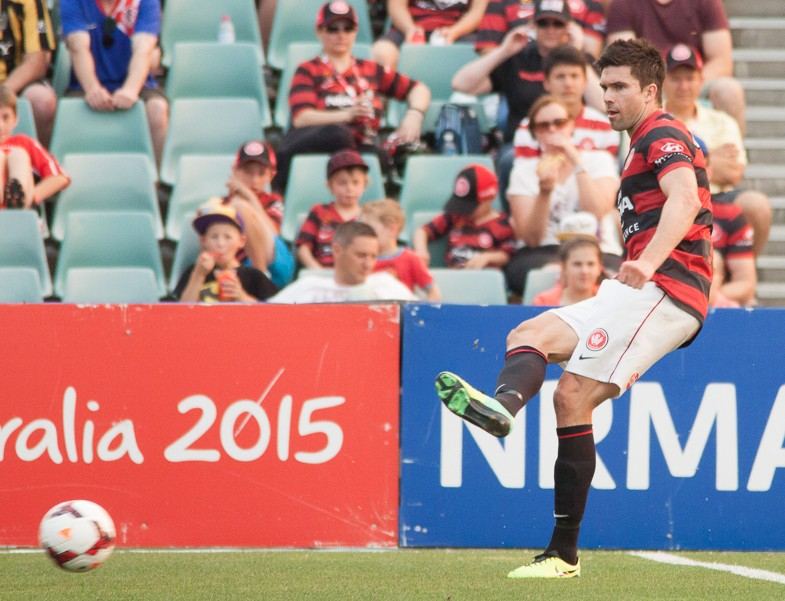
Beauchamp with the Western Sydney Wanderers in 2013

On 30 June 2012, it was officially announced he had joined the newly formed Western Sydney Wanderers club.

On 20 July 2013, Beauchamp started for the A-League All Stars in the inaugural A-League All Stars Game against Manchester United, a match in which the A-League All Stars were thrashed 5–1, courtesy of goals from Danny Welbeck, Jesse Lingard and Robin van Persie. Beauchamp was substituted off in the 83rd minute of the match, and was replaced by Perth Glory defender Joshua Risdon. Beauchamp was released by the Wanderers on 21 May 2014.

In late 2016, Beauchamp returned to Marconi Stallions, the club he left in 2002.

== International career ==
Beauchamp was called up into the Australian national under-23 squad (the "Olyroos") in January 2004 for the 2004 Summer Olympics qualifying tournament under Frank Farina. He made his international debut as a substitute, playing the final 34 minutes of Australia's 9–0 victory over Papua New Guinea. That appearance became Beauchamp's only game for the Olyroos, as he missed selection for the Olympic Games themselves, where the team made the quarter finals before being eliminated by Iraq.

In 2005, Beauchamp got his first taste at the senior level as he was twice called into the Socceroos training camp in the Netherlands under Guus Hiddink. The first occasion was in place of injured captain Craig Moore, but Beauchamp was called up again in the lead-up to Australia's 2006 World Cup qualification tie against the Solomon Islands. Although he did not play a part in the qualification campaign, Beauchamp's impressive A-League season earned him his first full international cap by playing the full 90 minutes in Australia's 3–1 win over Bahrain during qualifying for the 2007 Asian Cup. This was followed by Beauchamp's selection as one of only two A-League players in the Australian squad for the 2006 FIFA World Cup. Beauchamp did not make an appearance during the finals tournament, but picked up his second international cap in a warm-up game against Liechtenstein, playing 12 minutes as a substitute for Craig Moore.

On 7 October 2006, Beauchamp scored the own goal that gave Australia a 1–1 draw in a friendly against Paraguay. He came on late in the game, replacing Tony Popović (who was one of four senior Australian players retiring from international duty). With his first touch, after contact was made by Albirroja striker Óscar Cardozo, Beauchamp headed the ball into his own net.

On 16 July 2007, in something of a redemption for the above incident, Beauchamp scored the opening goal in Australia's must-win match in the group stage (Group A) of the 2007 Asian Cup against Thailand. Australia's form leading up to the game had been indifferent and the side faced embarrassing elimination from the tournament if they did not win the match. After Beauchamp's opener (a header home from a Luke Wilkshire free kick), Australia went on to win comfortably 4–0.

== Career statistics ==
Score and result list Australia's goal tally first, score column indicates score after Beauchamp goal.

International goal scored by Michael Beauchamp
No.	Date	Venue	Opponent	Score	Result	Competition	Ref.
1	16 July 2007		Thailand		4–0	2007 AFC Asian Cup	

== Honours ==
1. FC Nürnberg

- DFB-Pokal: 2006–07

Individual

- Central Coast Mariners Mariners Medal: 2005–06
- A-League All Star: 2013
