= Jason Trifiro =

Australian soccer player

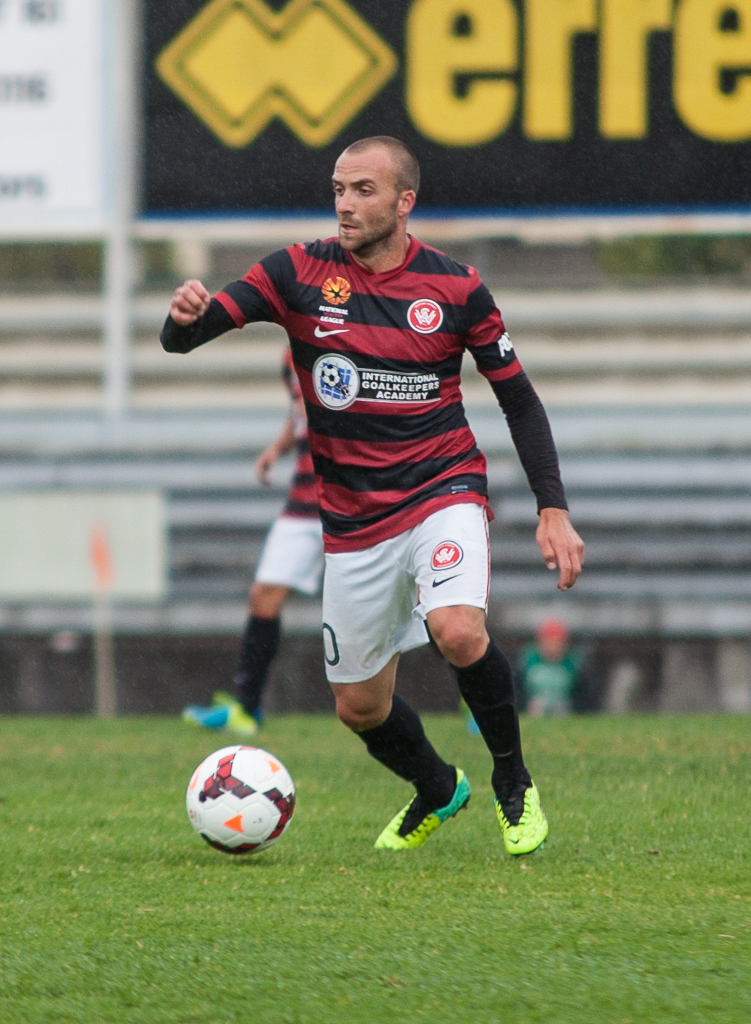
- Trifiro playing for Western Sydney Wanderers in 2013

Personal information
- Full name: Jason Trifiro
- Date of birth: 3 June 1988 (age 38)
- Place of birth: Winston Hills, New South Wales, Australia
- Height: 1.73 m (5 ft 8 in)
- Position: Central midfielder

Senior career*
Years	Team	Apps	(Gls)
2008	Marconi Stallions		
2009	APIA Leichhardt Tigers		
2010	South Coast Wolves		
2011	Northcote City	24	(5)
2012	South Melbourne	15	(3)
2012–2015	Western Sydney Wanderers	37	(0)
2015–2016	Melbourne City	7	(0)
2016	Blacktown Spartans	10	(1)
2017	Nunawading City	24	(1)
2018	Parramatta FC	21	(0)

International career
- Australia U17

Managerial career
- 2020–2021: Sydney United 58 FC (Under 20's)
- 2022: Sydney United 58 FC Assistant
- * Club domestic league appearances and goals as of 30 May 2022

Jason Trifiro (born 3 June 1988) is a former Australian football (soccer) player.

== Career ==
Trifiro started his career in the semi-professional lower leagues in Australia, playing in New South Wales for National Premier Leagues NSW clubs Marconi Stallions, APIA Leichhardt and the South Coast Wolves. In 2011, he moved to Victoria where he played the 2011 Victorian Premier League with Northcote alongside his brother, before they both moved to ex-NSL heavyweight South Melbourne in the National Premier Leagues Victoria.

In 2012 Trifiro was signed as one of the inaugural players for Western Sydney Wanderers. In 2014, he signed a one-year extension with the club. Following the 2014–15 A-League, Trifiro was one of a swathe of players released from the Wanderers, following a poor season in which the club narrowly avoided the wooden spoon, finishing 9th.

On 16 September 2015, Melbourne City signed Trifiro as their last signing on their roster.

On 28 April 2016, Trifiro was released by Melbourne City.

== Personal life ==
Jason's brother Glen Trifiro plays for Sydney United in the National Premier Leagues NSW.

The brothers run a football clinic called Futboltec. Its aims are to improve the technical aspects of young players' game, including passing, finishing, and overall awareness.
