= 2026–27 Melbourne City FC season =

16th season in existence of Melbourne City FC

Melbourne City
2026–27 season
- Owner: City Football Group
- Chairman: Khaldoon Al Mubarak
- Manager: Aurelio Vidmar
- Stadium: AAMI Park
- A-League Men: 7th
- Australia Cup: Round of 16
- Top goalscorer: League: Andrew Nabbout (2 goals); All: Andrew Nabbout (2 goals)
- Highest home attendance: 4,939 vs. Western Sydney Wanderers (31 October 2026); A-League Men
- Lowest home attendance: 4,888 vs. Sydney FC (7 November 2026); A-League Men
- Average home league attendance: 4,914
- Biggest win: 3–0 vs. Weston Bears (A) (26 July 2026); Australia Cup
- Biggest defeat: 0–2 vs. Lions FC (A) (11 August 2026); Australia Cup; 1–3 vs. Auckland FC (A) (17 OCtober 2026); A-League Men
Home colours	Away colours	Third colours
- All statistics correct as of 7 November 2026.

The 2026–27 season is Melbourne City Football Club's 16th season in the A-League Men; 12th since the club was taken over by the City Football Group. In addition to the domestic league, Melbourne City participated in the 2026 Australia Cup.

== Players ==
Note: Flags indicate national team as defined under FIFA eligibility rules; some limited exceptions apply. Players may hold more than one non-FIFA nationality.

No.	Pos.	Nation	Player
1	GK	AUS	Macklin Freke
2	DF	AUS	Harrison Delbridge
4	DF	AUS	Liam Bonetig
5	MF	BRA	Matheus Rossetto (on loan from Fortaleza)
7	FW	AUS	Mathew Leckie
9	FW	AUS	Max Caputo
10	MF	DEN	Emiliano Marcondes
11	FW	AUS	Awer Mabil
13	DF	AUS	Nathaniel Atkinson
14	DF	AUS	Besian Kutleshi
15	FW	AUS	Andrew Nabbout
16	DF	AUS	Aziz Behich (captain)
18	DF	CRC	Julio Cascante
19	MF	AUS	Quinn MacNicol
20	FW	AUS	Benjamin Mazzeo

No.	Pos.	Nation	Player
21	MF	AUS	Alessandro Lopane
22	DF	AUS	Peter Antoniou (scholarship)
23	FW	AUS	Medin Memeti
24	MF	AUS	Kavian Rahmani
26	DF	AUS	Ryan Kalms
34	DF	AUS	Jayden Necovski (scholarship)
36	DF	IDN	Mathew Baker
37	FW	AUS	Akeem Gerald
38	MF	AUS	Beckham Baker
39	FW	AUS	Roland Ballah
40	GK	AUS	James Nieuwenhuizen
41	MF	AUS	Lawrence Wong (scholarship)
77	FW	JPN	Takeshi Kanamori
—	MF	AUS	Luka Demuth

== Transfers and contracts ==
=== Transfers in ===
No.	Position	Player	Transferred from	Type/fee	Contract length	Date	Ref.
19	MF	Quinn Macnicol	Brisbane Roar	Free transfer	3 years	1 July 2026	
1	GK	Macklin Freke	Unattached	Free transfer	2 years	22 July 2026	
5	MF	(Brazil) Matheus Rossetto	(Brazil) Fortaleza	Loan	1 year	29 July 2026	
11	FW	Awer Mabil	(Spain) Castellón	Free transfer	3 years	6 August 2026	
10	MF	(Denmark) Emiliano Marcondes	Unattached	Free transfer	1 year	20 August 2026	
18	DF	(Costa Rica) Julio Cascante	Unattached	Free transfer	1 year (Note: Option for additional year)	17 September 2026	

==== From youth squad ====
No.	Position	Player	Age	Date	Notes	Ref.
39	FW	Roland Ballah	18	2 July 2026	2 year contract (Note: Option for an additional year.)	
	MF	Luka Demuth	16	1 October 2026	3 year contract	

=== Transfers out ===
No.	Position	Player	Transferred to	Type/fee	Date	Ref.
8	MF	Ryan Teague	(Belgium) Mechelen	End of loan	30 June 2026	
11	MF	(Kosovo) Elbasan Rashani	Unattached	End of contract	30 June 2026	
14	FW	Daniel Arzani	(Hungary) Ferencváros	End of loan	30 June 2026	
19	MF	Zane Schreiber	Newcastle Jets	End of contract	30 June 2026	
22	DF	(Argentina) Germán Ferreyra	Unattached	End of contract	30 June 2026	
26	DF	(France) Samuel Souprayen	Unattached	End of contract	30 June 2026	
28	FW	Marcus Younis	(Denmark) Brøndby	End of loan	30 June 2026	
30	MF	(Austria) Andreas Kuen	Unattached	End of contract	30 June 2026	
36	DF	Harry Shillington	Unattached	End of contract	30 June 2026	
39	MF	Emin Durakovic	Brisbane Roar	End of contract	30 June 2026	
1	GK	Patrick Beach	(France) Troyes	Undisclosed	19 July 2026	
42	GK	Lachlan Charles	(Australia) Oakleigh Cannons	Loan	14 October 2026	

=== Contract extensions ===
No.	Player	Position	Duration	Date	Notes
20	Benjamin Mazzeo	FW	1 year	22 May 2026	extension triggered
2	Harrison Delbridge	DF	1 year	25 June 2026	
26	Ryan Kalms	DF	2 years	25 June 2026	
15	Andrew Nabbout	FW	1 year	23 July 2026	
7	Mathew Leckie	FW	1 year	25 July 2026	
40	James Nieuwenhuizen	GK	2 years	22 September 2026	Contract extended from end of 2026–27 to end of 2028–29
23	Medin Memeti	FW	3 years	23 September 2026	Contract extended from end of 2026–27 to end of 2029–30

== Pre-season and friendlies ==
7 August 2026 Anglo-Palermitan Trophy	Melbourne City (Australia)	0–2	(Italy) Palermo	Perth, Australia
19:00 AWST		Report	Le Douaron 11'; Peda 54'	Stadium: Sam Kerr Football Centre

1 September 2026	Melbourne City (Australia)	2–1	(Australia) Newcastle Jets	Melbourne, Australia
	Caputo 10'; Kutleshi	Report	58'	Stadium: City Football Academy; Attendance: 0 (behind closed doors)

19 September 2026	Melbourne City (Australia)	1–1	(Australia) Perth Glory	Melbourne, Australia
	Memeti	Report (City); Report (Glory)	Wong (o.g.)	Stadium: Casey Fields; Attendance: 0 (behind closed doors)

25 September 2026	Oakleigh Cannons (Australia)	0–2	(Australia) Melbourne City	Melbourne, Australia
19:00 AEST		Report	Nabbout 24'; Bonetig 47'	Stadium: Jack Edwards Reserve

== Competitions ==
=== Overall record ===
Competition	First match	Last match	Starting round	Final position	Record							
Competition	First match	Last match	Starting round	Final position	Pld	W	D	L	GF	GA	GD	Win %
A-League Men	17 October 2026	8 May 2027	Matchday 1		4	2	1	1	6	6	+0	50.00
Australia Cup	26 July 2026	11 August 2026	Round of 32	Round of 16	2	1	0	1	3	2	+1	50.00
Total					6	3	1	2	9	8	+1	50.00

Last updated: 7 November 2026
Source: Soccerway

=== A-League Men ===
==== League table ====
Pos	Team	Pld	W	D	L	GF	GA	GD	Pts	Qualification
5	Macarthur FC	5	2	2	1	6	5	+1	8	Qualification for the finals series (Note: The top two teams enter the finals series at the semi-finals, while the teams ranked third to sixth enter the finals series at the elimination-finals.)
6	Perth Glory	5	2	1	2	8	5	+3	7	Qualification for the finals series
7	Melbourne City	4	2	1	1	6	6	0	7	
8	Auckland FC (Note: Auckland FC and Wellington Phoenix cannot qualify for Asian Football Confederation competitions as they are based in New Zealand, which is part of the Oceania Football Confederation.)	5	1	3	1	7	8	−1	6	
9	Melbourne Victory	5	0	4	1	6	7	−1	4	

Updated to match(es) played on 22 November 2026. Source: A-Leagues
Rules for classification: 1) points; 2) goal difference; 3) goals scored; 4) wins; 5) head-to-head results; 5a) head-to-head points; 5b) head-to-head goal difference; 6) Fair Play points; 7) away goal difference; 8) away goals per match; 9) home goal difference; 10) home goals per match; 11) toss of a coin in an event of a tie of two clubs.

==== Results summary ====
Overall								Home						Away					
Pld	W	D	L	GF	GA	GD	Pts	W	D	L	GF	GA	GD	W	D	L	GF	GA	GD
4	2	1	1	6	6	0	7	2	0	0	4	2	+2	0	1	1	2	4	−2

Last updated: 7 November 2026.
Source: Ultimate A-League

==== Results by round ====
Round	1	2	3	4	5	6	7	8	9	10	11	12	13	14	15	16	17	18	19	20	21	22	23	24	25	26	27
Ground	A	A	H	H	B	A	B	H	H	A	H	H	A	A	A	A	H	H	A	A	H	A	H	H	A	H	H
Result	L	D	W	W	X																						
Position	12	9	7	4	7																						
Points	0	1	4	7	7																						

Updated to match(es) played on 7 November 2026. Source: Ultimate A-League
A = Away; H = Home; W = Win; D = Draw; L = Loss; X = Bye

==== Matches ====
Win Draw Loss Fixtures

17 October 2026 1	Auckland FC	3–1	Melbourne City	Auckland
17:00 NZDT	Bayliss 35', 53'; Brook 85'	Report	MacNicol 42'	Stadium: Go Media Stadium; Attendance: 20,635; Referee: Tim Danaskos

24 October 2026 2	Melbourne Victory	1–1	Melbourne City	Melbourne
19:40 AEDT	Jelacic 7'	Report	Nabbout 53'	Stadium: AAMI Park; Attendance: 19,008; Referee: Daniel Elder

31 October 2026 3	Melbourne City	2–1	Sydney FC	Melbourne
17:00 AEDT	Marcondes 46'; Mabil 62'	Report	Toure 37'	Stadium: AAMI Park; Attendance: 4,888; Referee: Ben Abraham

7 November 2026 4	Melbourne City	2–1	Western Sydney Wanderers	Melbourne
19:40 AEDT	Rossetto 4'; Nabbout 62'	Report	Milanovic 45'	Stadium: AAMI Park; Attendance: 4,939; Referee: Alireza Faghani

27 November 2026 6	Macarthur FC	v	Melbourne City	Leumeah
19:40 AEDT		Report		Stadium: Campbelltown Sports Stadium

11 December 2026 8	Perth Glory	v	Melbourne City	Perth
21:45 AEDT		Report		Stadium: HBF Park

19 December 2026 9	Melbourne City	v	Melbourne Victory	Melbourne
19:40 AEDT		Report		Stadium: AAMI Park

27 December 2026 10	Melbourne City	v	Auckland FC	Melbourne
18:00 AEDT		Report		Stadium: AAMI Park

31 December 2026 11	Central Coast Mariners	v	Melbourne City	Gosford
19:00 AEDT		Report		Stadium: Polytec Stadium

10 January 2027 12	Melbourne City	v	Wellington Phoenix	Melbourne
17:00 AEST		Report		Stadium: AAMI Park

16 January 2027 13	Melbourne City	v	Brisbane Roar	Melbourne
17:00 AEST		Report		Stadium: AAMI Park

19 January 2027 5	Newcastle Jets	v	Melbourne City	Newcastle
19:00 AEDT		Report		Stadium: McDonald Jones Stadium

22 January 2027 14	Western Sydney Wanderers	v	Melbourne City	Sydney
19:40AEST		Report		Stadium: CommBank Stadium

29 January 2027 15	Adelaide United	v	Melbourne City	Adelaide
19:40 AEDT		Report		Stadium: Coopers Stadium

7 February 2027 16	Sydney FC	v	Melbourne City	Sydney
17:00 AEDT		Report		Stadium: Allianz Stadium

13 February 2027 17	Melbourne City	v	Central Coast Mariners	Melbourne
19:40 AEDT		Report		Stadium: AAMI Park

28 February 2027 19	Melbourne City	v	Wellington Phoenix	Melbourne
16:00 AEST		Report		Stadium: AAMI Park

6 March 2027 20	Melbourne Victory	v	Melbourne City	Melbourne
19:40 AEDT		Report		Stadium: AAMI Park

12 March 2027 21	Western Sydney Wanderers	v	Melbourne City	Sydney
19:40 AEDT		Report		Stadium: CommBank Stadium

21 March 2027 22	Melbourne City	v	Adelaide United	Melbourne
15:00 AEST		Report		Stadium: AAMI Park

3 April 2027 23	Brisbane Roar	v	Melbourne City	Brisbane
17:00 AEST		Report		Stadium: Suncorp Stadium

9 April 2027 24	Melbourne City	v	Macarthur FC	Melbourne
19:40 AEDT		Report		Stadium: AAMI Park

16 April 2027 25	Melbourne City	v	Perth Glory	Melbourne
19:40 AEDT		Report		Stadium: AAMI Park

24 April 2027 26	Wellington Phoenix	v	Melbourne City	Wellington
15:00 AEDT		Report		Stadium: Hnry Stadium

1 May 2027 27	Melbourne City	v	Central Coast Mariners	Melbourne
15:00 AEDT		Report		Stadium: AAMI Park

8 May 2027 28	Melbourne City	v	Newcastle Jets	Melbourne
17:00 AEDT		Report		Stadium: AAMI Park

=== Australia Cup ===
26 July 2026 Round of 32	Weston Bears	0–3	Melbourne City	Weston
14:00 AEST		Report	Wong 6'; Kutleshi 80'; Memeti 85'	Stadium: Hunter City Motor Group Stadium; Referee: Joshua Attard

11 August 2026 Round of 16	Lions FC	2–0	Melbourne City	Brisbane
19:30 AEST	Nieuwenhuizen 20' (o.g.); Hore 62'	Report		Stadium: Spencer Park; Attendance: 1,710; Referee: Mackenzie Janes

== Statistics ==
=== Appearances and goals ===
Includes all competitions. Players with no appearances not included in the list.

As of 7 November 2026

No.	Pos	Nat	Player	Total		A-League Men		Australia Cup	
No.	Pos	Nat	Player	Apps	Goals	Apps	Goals	Apps	Goals
1	GK	(Australia) AUS	Macklin Freke	2	0	2	0	0	0
2	DF	(Australia) AUS	Harrison Delbridge	6	0	4	0	2	0
4	DF	(Australia) AUS	Liam Bonetig	6	0	2+2	0	2	0
5	MF	(Brazil) BRA	Matheus Rossetto	1	1	1	1	0	0
7	MF	(Australia) AUS	Matthew Leckie	4	0	0+4	0	0	0
9	FW	(Australia) AUS	Max Caputo	3	0	0+1	0	1+1	0
10	MF	(Denmark) DEN	Emiliano Marcondes	3	1	1+2	1	0	0
11	FW	(Australia) AUS	Awer Mabil	4	1	4	1	0	0
13	DF	(Australia) AUS	Nathaniel Atkinson	6	0	4	0	2	0
14	DF	(Australia) AUS	Besian Kutleshi	6	1	3+1	0	2	1
15	FW	(Australia) AUS	Andrew Nabbout	6	2	4	2	1+1	0
16	DF	(Australia) AUS	Aziz Behich	4	0	4	0	0	0
18	DF	(Costa Rica) CRC	Julio Cascante	3	0	2+1	0	0	0
19	MF	(Australia) AUS	Quinn MacNicol	4	1	3+1	1	0	0
20	MF	(Australia) AUS	Benjamin Mazzeo	1	0	0	0	0+1	0
22	DF	(Australia) AUS	Peter Antoniou	2	0	0	0	2	0
23	FW	(Australia) AUS	Medin Memeti	6	1	4	0	2	1
24	MF	(Australia) AUS	Kavian Rahmani	6	0	4	0	2	0
37	MF	(Australia) AUS	Akeem Gerald	1	0	0	0	0+1	0
38	MF	(Australia) AUS	Beckham Baker	2	0	0	0	2	0
39	MF	(Australia) AUS	Roland Ballah	4	0	0+2	0	0+2	0
40	GK	(Australia) AUS	James Nieuwenhuizen	4	0	2	0	2	0
41	MF	(Australia) AUS	Lawrence Wong	3	1	0+1	0	2	1
43	MF	(Australia) AUS	Angus Mackintosh	1	0	0	0	0+1	0
44	DF	(Australia) AUS	Isiah Boston	2	0	0	0	0+2	0
77	FW	(Japan) JPN	Takeshi Kanamori	4	0	0+3	0	0+1	0

=== Disciplinary record ===
Includes all competitions. The list is sorted by squad number when total cards are equal. Players with no cards not included in the list.

As of 7 November 2026

No.	Pos	Nat	Player	Total			A-League Men			Australia Cup		
No.	Pos	Nat	Player	Yellow card	Second yellow card	Red card	Yellow card	Second yellow card	Red card	Yellow card	Second yellow card	Red card
2	DF	(Australia) AUS	Harrison Delbridge	1	0	0	1	0	0	0	0	0
7	FW	(Australia) AUS	Matthew Leckie	1	0	0	1	0	0	0	0	0
11	FW	(Australia) AUS	Awer Mabil	0	0	1	0	0	1	0	0	0
15	FW	(Australia) AUS	Andrew Nabbout	1	0	0	1	0	0	0	0	0
16	DF	(Australia) AUS	Aziz Behich	2	0	0	2	0	0	0	0	0
18	DF	(Costa Rica) CRC	Julio Cascante	1	0	0	1	0	0	0	0	0
24	MF	(Australia) AUS	Kavian Rahmani	1	0	0	0	0	0	1	0	0
41	MF	(Australia) AUS	Lawrence Wong	1	0	0	0	0	0	1	0	0
Player(s) transferred out but featured this season

- (yellow card) = Number of bookings; (second yellow card) = Number of sending offs after a second yellow card; (red card) = Number of sending offs by a direct red card.

=== Clean sheets ===
Includes all competitions. The list is sorted by squad number when total clean sheets are equal. Numbers in parentheses represent games where both goalkeepers participated and both kept a clean sheet; the number in parentheses is awarded to the goalkeeper who was substituted on, whilst a full clean sheet is awarded to the goalkeeper who was on the field at the start and end of play. Goalkeepers with no clean sheets not included in the list.

As of 7 November 2026

Rank	No.	Nat.	Goalkeeper	A-League Men	Australia Cup	Total
1	40	(Australia)	James Nieuwenhuizen	0	1	1
Total				0	1	1

== See also ==
- 2026–27 Melbourne City FC (women) season
