= 2025–26 Melbourne City FC season =

16th season in existence of Melbourne City FC

Melbourne City
2025–26 season
- Owner: City Football Group
- Chairman: Khaldoon Al Mubarak
- Manager: Aurelio Vidmar
- Stadium: AAMI Park
- A-League Men: 6th
- A-League Men finals series: Elimination-final
- Australia Cup: Round of 32
- AFC Champions League Elite: Round of 16
- Top goalscorer: League: Max Caputo (8); All: Max Caputo (10)
- Highest home attendance: 21,439 vs. Melbourne Victory (21 February 2026); A-League Men
- Lowest home attendance: 3,683 vs. Brisbane Roar (6 January 2026); A-League Men
- Average home league attendance: 7,319
- Biggest win: 4–0 vs. Perth Glory (H) (15 October 2025); A-League Men
- Biggest defeat: 2–6 vs. Macarthur FC (A) (24 January 2026); A-League Men
Home colours	Away colours	Third colours
- All statistics correct as of 2 May 2026.

The 2025–26 season is Melbourne City Football Club's 15th season in the A-League Men; 11th since the club was taken over by the City Football Group. In addition to the domestic league, Melbourne City participated in this season's edition of the Australia Cup.

== Review and events ==
=== Background ===
Melbourne City's 2024–25 season saw them finish 2nd in the A-League Men regular season qualifying for the AFC Champions League Elite and won the Grand Final 1–0 against Melbourne Victory for their second A-League Men championship.

=== Pre-season ===
On 6 June, Steven Ugarkovic departed City following the end of his two-year contract whilst Alessandro Lopane signed on for three seasons. The day after, Samuel Souprayen signed on for one season. Youth players Arion Sulemani and Harry Politidis departed following the conclusion of their contracts on 12 June. The day after, Max Caputo also signed a three-year contract extension whilst Callum Talbot departed following the conclusion of his contract. A week later, Harry Shillington signed a one-year contract extension.

City's Australia Cup Round of 32 opponents were confirmed on 26 June, to verse NPL NSW side APIA Leichhardt away in which it was confirmed to be played on 30 July at Leichhardt Oval; exactly one month until then. Two days later, Jimmy Jeggo announced his retirement from professional football. On 7 July, goalkeeper Patrick Beach also signed a three-year contract extension.

On 11 July, City's first new signing was Australian defender Liam Bonetig from Scottish side Celtic B on a three-year deal. A week later, City officially returned to training in preparations for the upcoming season. On 21 July, Marco Tilio's loan at City ended and returned to Celtic. Two days later, academy product Beckham Baker signed on a three-year deal for his first professional contract at City.

=== July/August ===
City's season began with their Australia Cup Round of 32 clash against APIA Leichhardt on 30 July. City fielded a relatively youthful side of an average age of 17.6 and lost 2–0, exiting the cup in the first round. On 5 August, City signed Japanese attacker Takeshi Kanamori from J1 League side Avispa Fukuoka on a two-year deal. On 15 August, City's group stage opponents for the 2025–26 AFC Champions League Elite were confirmed to face Buriram United, Johor Darul Ta'zim, Sanfrecce Hiroshima and Gangwon FC at home, and Ulsan HD, Vissel Kobe, FC Seoul and Machida Zelvia away. The following week, it was confirmed that Yonatan Cohen departed City following the end of his one-year contract. On 28 August, Beckham Baker was called up for the Australia under-17 squad for the International Youth Football Tournament in Niigata, Japan.

=== September ===
City played their first friendly of the season on 2 September against Adelaide United at the Home of the Matildas, resulting in a 1–1 draw with Andreas Kuen scoring the goal.

== Players ==
Note: Flags indicate national team as defined under FIFA eligibility rules; some limited exceptions apply. Players may hold more than one non-FIFA nationality.

No.	Pos.	Nation	Player
1	GK	AUS	Patrick Beach
2	DF	AUS	Harrison Delbridge
4	DF	AUS	Liam Bonetig
7	FW	AUS	Mathew Leckie
8	MF	AUS	Ryan Teague (on loan from Mechelen)
10	FW	JPN	Takeshi Kanamori
11	FW	KOS	Elbasan Rashani
13	DF	AUS	Nathaniel Atkinson
14	FW	AUS	Daniel Arzani (on loan from Ferencváros)
15	FW	AUS	Andrew Nabbout
16	DF	AUS	Aziz Behich (captain)
17	FW	AUS	Max Caputo
19	MF	AUS	Zane Schreiber
20	FW	AUS	Benjamin Mazzeo
21	MF	AUS	Alessandro Lopane
22	DF	ARG	Germán Ferreyra
26	DF	FRA	Samuel Souprayen

No.	Pos.	Nation	Player
28	FW	AUS	Marcus Younis (on loan from Brøndby)
30	MF	AUT	Andreas Kuen
34	DF	AUS	Jayden Necovski (scholarship)
35	FW	AUS	Medin Memeti
36	DF	AUS	Harry Shillington
37	DF	AUS	Peter Antoniou (scholarship)
38	MF	AUS	Beckham Baker
39	MF	AUS	Emin Durakovic
40	GK	AUS	James Nieuwenhuizen
41	MF	AUS	Lawrence Wong (scholarship)
44	DF	AUS	Besian Kutleshi
45	DF	AUS	Ryan Kalms
46	FW	AUS	Akeem Gerald
47	MF	AUS	Kavian Rahmani
48	DF	IDN	Mathew Baker
60	GK	AUS	Lachlan Charles

== Transfers and contracts ==
=== Transfers in ===
No.	Position	Player	Transferred from	Type/fee	Contract length	Date	Ref.
4	DF	Liam Bonetig	(Scotland) Celtic	Free transfer	3 years	11 July 2025	
10	FW	(Japan) Takeshi Kanamori	(Japan) Avispa Fukuoka	Free transfer	2 years	5 August 2025	
11	FW	(Kosovo) Elbasan Rashani	Unattached	Free transfer	1 year	12 September 2025	
44	DF	Besian Kutleshi	Unattached	Free transfer	3 years (Note: Option for two additional years.)	15 September 2025	
8	MF	Ryan Teague	(Belgium) Mechelen	Loan	6 months	14 January 2026	
14	FW	Daniel Arzani	(Hungary) Ferencváros	Loan	6 months	21 January 2026	
28	FW	Marcus Younis	(Denmark) Brøndby	Loan	6 months	23 January 2026	
2	DF	Harrison Delbridge	Unattached	Free transfer	6 months	23 January 2026	

==== From youth squad ====
No.	Position	Player	Age	Date	Notes	Ref.
47	MF	Kavian Rahmani	18	1 July 2025	3 year contract	
60	GK	Lachlan Charles	18	1 July 2025	3 year contract	
38	MF	Beckham Baker	16	23 July 2025	3 year contract	
46	FW	Akeem Gerald	15	19 September 2025	3 year contract	
48	DF	(Indonesia) Mathew Baker	16	30 September 2025	3 year contract	
45	DF	Ryan Kalms	19	3 October 2025	1-year contract	

=== Transfers out ===
No.	Position	Player	Transferred to	Type/fee	Date	Ref.
6	MF	Steven Ugarkovic	Western Sydney Wanderers	End of contract	30 June 2025	
10	MF	(Israel) Yonatan Cohen	Unattached	End of contract	30 June 2025	
20	FW	Arion Sulemani	Perth Glory	Mutual contract termination	30 June 2025	
38	DF	Harry Politidis	Macarthur FC	End of contract	30 June 2025	
2	DF	Callum Talbot	Macarthur FC	End of contract	30 June 2025	
23	MF	Marco Tilio	(Scotland) Celtic	End of loan	30 June 2025	
8	MF	James Jeggo	Retired		3 July 2025	
27	DF	Kai Trewin	(United States) New York City	Undisclosed	28 January 2026	
33	GK	Dakota Ochsenham	Unattached	End of contract	2 February 2026	

=== Contract extensions ===
No.	Player	Position	Duration	Date	Notes
21	Alessandro Lopane	MF	3 years	6 June 2025	
26	(France) Samuel Souprayen	DF	1 year	7 June 2025	
17	Max Caputo	FW	3 years	13 June 2025	New 3-year contract replacing previous contract.
36	Harry Shillington	DF	1 year	20 June 2025	
1	Patrick Beach	GK	3 years	7 July 2025	New 3-year contract replacing previous contract.

== Pre-season and friendlies ==
Win Draw Loss Fixtures

2 September 2025	Melbourne City (Australia)	1–1	(Australia) Adelaide United	Melbourne
	Kuen 74'	Report	Jovanovic 25'	Stadium: The Home of the Matildas; Attendance: 0 (behind closed doors)

23 September 2025	Melbourne City (Australia)	3–2	(Australia) Newcastle Jets	Melbourne
	Durakovic 17'; Rahmani 21'; Behich	Report	Bertoncello 45'; Burgess 67'	Stadium: City Football Academy; Attendance: 0 (behind closed doors)

10 October 2025	Melbourne City (Australia)	0–0	(New Zealand) Auckland FC	Melbourne
		Report		Stadium: City Football Academy; Attendance: 0 (behind closed doors)

== Competitions ==
=== Overall record ===
Competition	First match	Last match	Starting round	Final position	Record							
Competition	First match	Last match	Starting round	Final position	Pld	W	D	L	GF	GA	GD	Win %
A-League Men	18 October 2025	26 April 2026	Matchday 1	6th	26	10	8	8	33	33	+0	38.46
A-League Men finals series	2 May 2026	2 May 2026	Elimination-final	Elimination-final	1	0	1	0	1	1	+0	0.00
Australia Cup	30 July 2025		Round of 32	Round of 32	1	0	0	1	0	2	−2	0.00
AFC Champions League Elite	16 September 2025	10 March 2026	League stage	Round of 16	10	4	4	2	10	8	+2	40.00
Total					38	14	13	11	44	44	+0	36.84

Last updated: 2 May 2026
Source: Soccerway

=== A-League Men ===
==== League table ====
Pos	Team	Pld	W	D	L	GF	GA	GD	Pts	Qualification
4	Melbourne Victory	26	11	7	8	44	33	+11	40	Qualification for the AFC Champions League Two group stage and the finals series (Note: Since the 2025 Australia Cup winners, Newcastle Jets, occupy an AFC Champions League Elite position, the AFC Champions League Two spot goes to the next eligible team. The AFC ruled that the Australia Cup runner-up Heidelberg United was ineligible to compete.)
5	Sydney FC	26	11	6	9	33	25	+8	39	Qualification for the finals series (Note: The top two teams enter the finals series at the semi-finals, while the teams ranked third to sixth enter the finals series at the elimination-finals.)
6	Melbourne City	26	10	8	8	33	33	0	38	Qualification for the finals series
7	Macarthur FC	26	9	7	10	37	44	−7	34	
8	Wellington Phoenix (Note: Auckland FC and Wellington Phoenix cannot qualify for Asian Football Confederation competitions as they are based in New Zealand, which is part of the Oceania Football Confederation.)	26	9	6	11	36	48	−12	33	

Source: A-Leagues
Rules for classification: 1) points; 2) goal difference; 3) goals scored; 4) wins; 5) head-to-head results; 5a) head-to-head points; 5b) head-to-head goal difference; 6) Fair Play points; 7) away goal difference; 8) away goals per match; 9) home goal difference; 10) home goals per match; 11) toss of a coin in an event of a tie of two clubs.

==== Results summary ====
Overall								Home						Away					
Pld	W	D	L	GF	GA	GD	Pts	W	D	L	GF	GA	GD	W	D	L	GF	GA	GD
26	9	8	9	33	33	0	35	6	2	5	18	13	+5	3	6	4	15	20	−5

Last updated: 26 April 2026.
Source: Ultimate A-League

==== Results by round ====
Round	1	2	3	4	5	6	7	9	8	10	11	20	12	13	14	15	16	18	19	21	22	23	17	24	25	26
Ground	A	H	A	A	A	A	A	H	H	H	H	H	H	H	A	A	A	H	A	A	A	H	H	H	A	H
Result	D	W	D	W	L	D	W	L	D	L	D	W	L	W	L	D	D	L	L	W	D	W	W	W	W	L
Position	6	1	3	3	4	5	4	4	4	7	8	5	6	5	8	6	7	8	9	7	9	8	6	6	5	6
Points	1	4	5	8	8	9	12	12	13	13	14	17	17	20	20	21	22	22	22	25	26	29	32	35	38	38

Updated to match(es) played on 26 April 2026. Source: Ultimate A-League
A = Away; H = Home; W = Win; D = Draw; L = Loss

==== Matches ====
18 October 2025 1	Western Sydney Wanderers	1–1	Melbourne City	Sydney
17:00 AEDT	Barbarouses 11'	Report	Caputo 13'	Stadium: CommBank Stadium; Attendance: 9,205; Referee: Alex King

25 October 2025 2	Melbourne City	4–0	Perth Glory	Melbourne
17:00 AEDT	Caputo 5', 36'; Schreiber 84'; Rahmani 90+1'	Report		Stadium: AAMI Park; Attendance: 6,102; Referee: Alireza Faghani

31 October 2025 3	Brisbane Roar	0–0	Melbourne City	Brisbane
19:35 AEDT		Report		Stadium: Suncorp Stadium; Attendance: 5,166; Referee: Ben Abraham

8 November 2025 4	Melbourne Victory	0–2	Melbourne City	Melbourne
19:35 AEDT		Report	Caputo 2'; Antoniou 55'	Stadium: AAMI Park; Attendance: 18,319; Referee: Alex King

21 November 2025 5	Adelaide United	4–1	Melbourne City	Adelaide
19:35 AEDT	Alagich 12'; Jovanovic 15'; White 79'; Barnett 84'	Report	Kanamori 40'	Stadium: Coopers Stadium; Attendance: 10,260; Referee: Shaun Evans

29 November 2025 6	Central Coast Mariners	0–0	Melbourne City	Gosford
17:00 AEDT		Report		Stadium: Polytec Stadium; Attendance: 3,127; Referee: Eric Saba

6 December 2025 7	Newcastle Jets	0–1	Melbourne City	Newcastle
17:00 AEDT		Report	Rahmani 27'	Stadium: McDonald Jones Stadium; Attendance: 3,728; Referee: Tim Danaskos

20 December 2025 9	Melbourne City	0–1	Melbourne Victory	Melbourne
19:35 AEDT		Report	Grimaldi 90+1'	Stadium: AAMI Park; Attendance: 17,619; Referee: Alireza Faghani

23 December 2025 8	Melbourne City	1–1	Macarthur FC	Melbourne
19:15 AEDT	Behich 25'	Report	Durán 36'	Stadium: AAMI Park; Attendance: 4,304; Referee: Jonathan Barreiro

28 December 2025 10	Melbourne City	1–3	Perth Glory	Melbourne
19:00 AEDT	Nabbout 90+3'	Report	Lawrence 10', 22', 80'	Stadium: AAMI Park; Attendance: 7,035; Referee: Casey Reibelt

3 January 2026 11	Melbourne City	0–0	Sydney FC	Melbourne
19:35 AEDT		Report		Stadium: AAMI Park; Attendance: 5,035; Referee: Shaun Evans
Note: Due to the availability of Allianz Stadium, the hosting of rounds 11 and 21 were switched and the dates changed.

6 January 2026 20	Melbourne City	1–0	Brisbane Roar	Melbourne
19:00 AEDT	Caputo 11'	Report		Stadium: AAMI Park; Attendance: 3,683; Referee: Tim Danaskos

11 January 2026 12	Melbourne City	0–1	Newcastle Jets	Melbourne
17:00 AEDT		Report	Rose 67'	Stadium: AAMI Park; Attendance: 5,288; Referee: Casey Reibelt

16 January 2026 13	Melbourne City	2–1	Auckland FC	Melbourne
19:35 AEDT	Caputo 70' (pen.); Memeti 81'	Report	Brook 45+2'	Stadium: AAMI Park; Attendance: 5,578; Referee: Shane Skinner

24 January 2026 14	Macarthur FC	6–2	Melbourne City	Leumeah
19:35 AEDT	Duke 6'; Brattan 9'; Caceres 34'; Vickery 62'; Bosnjak 70'; Sawyer 90+3'	Report	Memeti 24'; Younis 84'	Stadium: Campbelltown Sports Stadium; Attendance: 3,654; Referee: Lachlan Keevers

30 January 2026 15	Wellington Phoenix	2–2	Melbourne City	Wellington
17:00 AEDT	Eze 23', 52'	Report	Younis 73'; Memeti 77'	Stadium: Sky Stadium; Attendance: 3,679; Referee: Alireza Faghani

7 February 2026 16	Western Sydney Wanderers	1–1	Melbourne City	Sydney
19:35 AEDT	Kraev 77'	Report	Behich 65'	Stadium: CommBank Stadium; Attendance: 5,081; Referee: Eric Saba

21 February 2026 18	Melbourne City	1–3	Melbourne Victory	Melbourne
19:35 AEDT	Caputo 32'	Report	Mata 20', 64'; Santos 89'	Stadium: AAMI Park; Attendance: 21,439; Referee: Daniel Elder

28 February 2026 19	Auckland FC	3–0	Melbourne City	Auckland
15:00 AEDT	Rogerson 43'; Randall 59'; May 66'	Report		Stadium: Go Media Stadium; Attendance: 13,112; Referee: Ben Abraham

17 March 2026 21	Sydney FC	0–1	Melbourne City	Sydney
19:00 AEDT		Report	Caputo 54'	Stadium: Allianz Stadium; Attendance: 5,115; Referee: Daniel Elder
Note: Due to the availability of Allianz Stadium, the hosting of rounds 11 and 21 were switched and the dates changed.

22 March 2026 22	Perth Glory	1–1	Melbourne City	Perth
19:00 AEDT	Taggart 90+1'	Report	Arzani 21'	Stadium: HBF Park; Attendance: 6,029; Referee: Shaun Evans

4 April 2026 23	Melbourne City	3–0	Western Sydney Wanderers	Melbourne
19:35 AEDT	Kuen 23'; Younis 33'; Rashani 49'	Report		Stadium: AAMI Park; Attendance: 4,458; Referee: Lachlan Keevers

7 April 2026 17	Melbourne City	2–1	Central Coast Mariners	Melbourne
19:00 AEDT	Kuen 22'; Nabbout 67'	Report	Auglah 90+4'	Stadium: AAMI Park; Attendance: 3,211; Referee: Daniel Elder
Note: The match was postponed from 13 February due to Melbourne City's participation in the 2025–26 AFC Champions League Elite.

12 April 2026 24	Melbourne City	2–0	Wellington Phoenix	Melbourne
15:00 AEST	Behich 27'; Younis 76'	Report		Stadium: AAMI Park; Attendance: 4,896; Referee: Alex King

18 April 2026 25	Brisbane Roar	2–3	Melbourne City	Brisbane
17:00 AEST	Vidic 44'; Salas 90+2'	Report	Younis 61' (pen.), 66'; Memeti 80'	Stadium: Suncorp Stadium; Attendance: 6,845; Referee: Daniel Elder

26 April 2026 26	Melbourne City	1–2	Adelaide United	Melbourne
17:00 AEST	Younis 17'	Report	Jovanovic 79', 90+8'	Stadium: AAMI Park; Attendance: 6,497; Referee: Alex King

==== Finals series ====
2 May 2026 Elimination-final	Auckland FC	1–1 (a.e.t.) (7–6 p)	Melbourne City	Auckland
17:00 NZST	May 45+3'	Report	Memeti 90+4'	Stadium: Go Media Stadium; Attendance: 11,351; Referee: Alex King
	Penalties
	Cosgrove (penalty scored); May (penalty scored); Brimmer (penalty scored); Gillion (penalty scored); Pijnaker (penalty scored); Sakai (penalty scored); Hall (penalty scored)		(penalty scored) Nabbout; (penalty scored) Leckie; (penalty scored) Younis; (penalty scored) Schreiber; (penalty scored) Memeti; (penalty scored) Behich; (penalty missed) Atkinson

=== Australia Cup ===
30 July 2025 Round of 32	APIA Leichhardt	2–0	Melbourne City	Sydney
19:30 AEST	Kambayashi 27'; Stewart 79'	Report		Stadium: Leichhardt Oval; Attendance: 2,793; Referee: Nathan Shakespear

=== AFC Champions League Elite ===
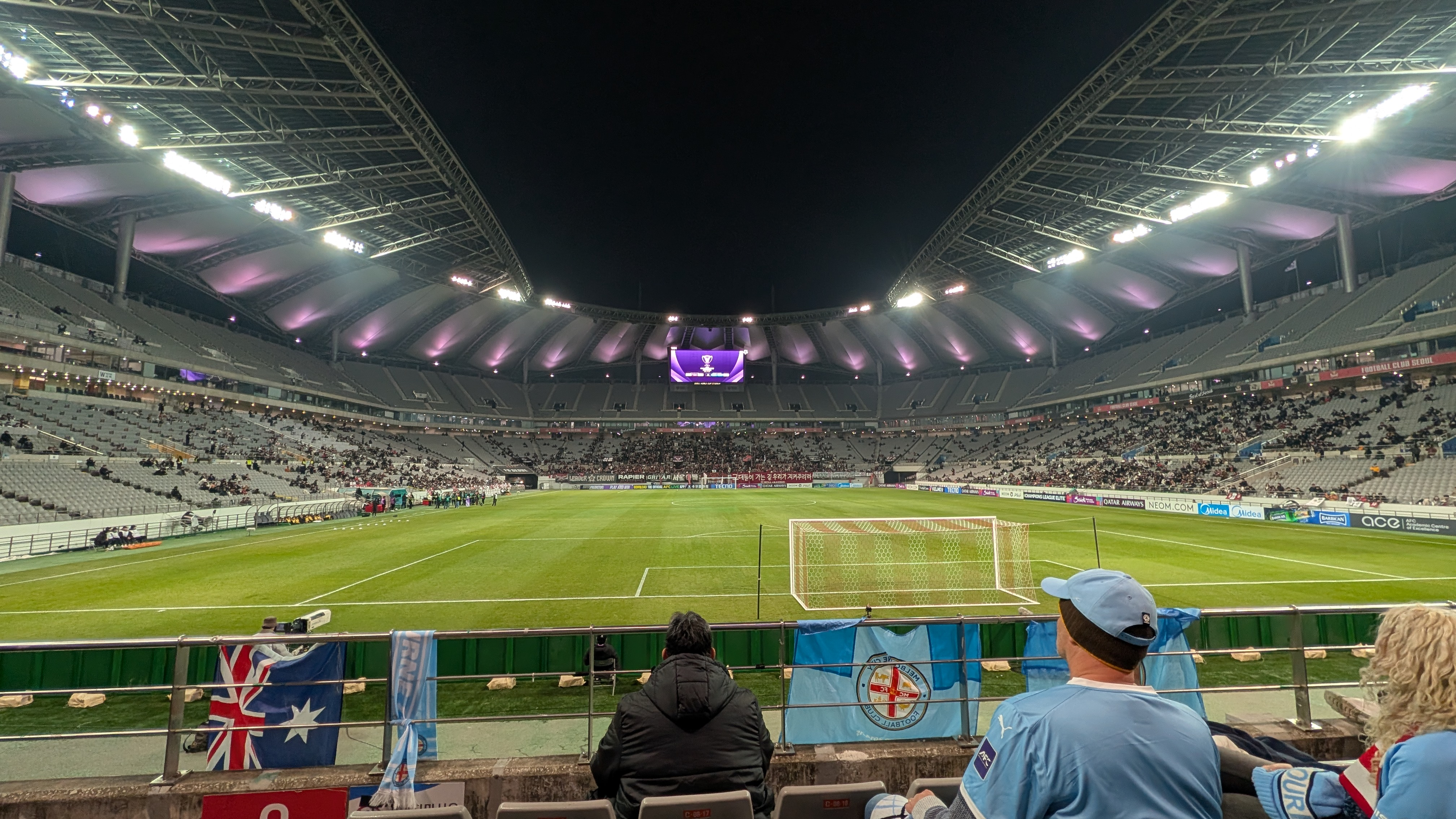
FC Seoul v Melbourne City on 10 December 2025.

==== League stage ====
Pos	Team	Pld	W	D	L	GF	GA	GD	Pts	Qualification
3	(Japan) Sanfrecce Hiroshima	8	4	3	1	10	6	+4	15	Advance to round of 16
4	(Thailand) Buriram United	8	4	2	2	10	8	+2	14	Advance to round of 16
5	(Australia) Melbourne City	8	4	2	2	9	7	+2	14	Advance to round of 16
6	(Malaysia) Johor Darul Ta'zim	8	3	2	3	8	7	+1	11	Advance to round of 16
7	(South Korea) FC Seoul	8	2	4	2	10	9	+1	10	Advance to round of 16

Source: AFC
Rules for classification: 1) points; 2) goal difference; 3) number of goals scored; 4) number of matches won; 5) penalty shoot-out if only two teams remain tied and played each other on the final matchday 6) fair play ranking; 7) drawing of lots

16 September 2025 1	Melbourne City (Australia)	0–2	(Japan) Sanfrecce Hiroshima	Melbourne, Australia
17:45 AEST		Report	Júnior 52' (pen.); Nakajima 81'	Stadium: Melbourne Rectangular Stadium; Attendance: 1,423; Referee: Payam Heydari (Iran)

1 October 2025 2	Vissel Kobe (Japan)	1–0	(Australia) Melbourne City	Kobe, Japan
19:00 UTC+9	Yuruki 90+4'	Report		Stadium: Kobe City Misaki Park Stadium; Attendance: 5,119; Referee: Rustam Lutfullin (Uzbekistan)

21 October 2025 3	Melbourne City (Australia)	2–1	(Thailand) Buriram United	Melbourne, Australia
18:45 AEDT	Rashani 84'; Caputo 90+7'	Report	Čaušić 72'	Stadium: Melbourne Rectangular Stadium; Attendance: 2,018; Referee: Yoshimi Yamashita (Japan)

4 November 2025 4	Machida Zelvia (Japan)	1–2	(Australia) Melbourne City	Machida, Japan
19:00 UTC+9	Mochizuki 24'	Report	Shoji 1' (o.g.); Nabbout 90+4'	Stadium: Nozuta Park Stadium; Attendance: 4,401; Referee: Abdulla Al Marri (Qatar)

25 November 2025 5	Melbourne City (Australia)	2–0	(Malaysia) Johor Darul Ta'zim	Melbourne, Australia
18:45 AEDT	Caputo 3'; Memeti 90+2'	Report		Stadium: Melbourne Rectangular Stadium; Attendance: 2,165; Referee: Adel Al-Naqbi (United Arab Emirates)

10 December 2025 6	FC Seoul (South Korea)	1–1	(Australia) Melbourne City	Seoul, South Korea
19:00 UTC+9	Lingard 31'	Report	Kanamori 74'	Stadium: Seoul World Cup Stadium; Attendance: 8,106; Referee: Mohanad Qasim Sarray (Iraq)

11 February 2026 7	Ulsan HD (South Korea)	1–2	(Australia) Melbourne City	Ulsan, South Korea
19:00 UTC+9	Bojanić 80'	Report	Caputo 36'; Younis 90+3'	Stadium: Ulsan Munsu Football Stadium; Attendance: 3,750; Referee: Ahmed Al-Kaf (Oman)

18 February 2026 8	Melbourne City (Australia)	0–0	(South Korea) Gangwon FC	Melbourne, Australia
21:00 AEDT		Report		Stadium: Melbourne Rectangular Stadium; Attendance: 936; Referee: Mohammed Al-Shammari (Qatar)

==== Knockout stage ====
3 March 2026 Round of 16	Melbourne City (Australia)	1–1	(Thailand) Buriram United	Melbourne, Australia
18:45 AEDT	Mazzeo 90+5'	Report	Bissoli 37'	Stadium: Melbourne Rectangular Stadium; Attendance: 1,478; Referee: Khalid Al-Turais (Saudi Arabia)

10 March 2026 Round of 16	Buriram United (Thailand)	0–0 (a.e.t.) (1–1 agg.) (4–2 p)	(Australia) Melbourne City	Buriram, Thailand
19:15 UTC+7:00		Report		Stadium: Buriram Stadium; Attendance: 22,950; Referee: Kim Jong-Hyeok (South Korea)
	Penalties
	Čaušić (penalty scored); Schindler (penalty scored); P. Žulj (penalty scored); Dougall (penalty scored)		(penalty scored) Caputo; (penalty missed) Teague; (penalty missed) Behich; (penalty scored) Younis

== Statistics ==
=== Appearances and goals ===
Includes all competitions. Players with no appearances not included in the list.

As of 26 April 2026

No.	Pos	Nat	Player	Total		A-League Men		A-League Men finals series		Australia Cup		AFC Champions League Elite	
No.	Pos	Nat	Player	Apps	Goals	Apps	Goals	Apps	Goals	Apps	Goals	Apps	Goals
1	GK	(Australia) AUS	Patrick Beach	35	0	24	0	1	0	0	0	10	0
2	DF	(Australia) AUS	Harrison Delbridge	6	0	3+1	0	1	0	0	0	1	0
4	DF	(Australia) AUS	Liam Bonetig	18	0	9+6	0	0	0	0	0	1+2	0
7	MF	(Australia) AUS	Mathew Leckie	8	0	3+3	0	1	0	0	0	1	0
8	MF	(Australia) AUS	Ryan Teague	13	0	9	0	0	0	0	0	4	0
10	FW	(Japan) JPN	Takeshi Kanamori	20	2	10+3	1	0+1	0	0	0	4+2	1
11	FW	(Kosovo) KOS	Elbasan Rashani	17	2	9+3	1	1	0	0	0	1+3	1
13	DF	(Australia) AUS	Nathaniel Atkinson	30	0	20+1	0	1	0	0	0	7+1	0
14	FW	(Australia) AUS	Daniel Arzani	12	1	7+1	1	0	0	0	0	2+2	0
15	FW	(Australia) AUS	Andrew Nabbout	19	3	8+8	2	0+1	0	0	0	0+2	1
16	DF	(Australia) AUS	Aziz Behich	34	3	24	3	1	0	0	0	9	0
17	FW	(Australia) AUS	Max Caputo	37	11	21+5	8	1	0	1	0	7+2	3
19	MF	(Australia) AUS	Zane Schreiber	31	1	13+9	1	0+1	0	1	0	4+3	0
20	FW	(Australia) AUS	Benjamin Mazzeo	16	1	5+5	0	0	0	0	0	0+6	1
21	MF	(Australia) AUS	Alessandro Lopane	10	0	4+3	0	0	0	1	0	2	0
22	DF	(Argentina) ARG	Germán Ferreyra	36	0	25	0	1	0	0	0	10	0
26	DF	(France) FRA	Samuel Souprayen	23	0	13+3	0	0	0	0	0	6+1	0
28	FW	(Australia) AUS	Marcus Younis	15	8	9+2	7	1	0	0	0	3	1
30	MF	(Austria) AUT	Andreas Kuen	34	2	20+4	2	1	0	0	0	9	0
35	FW	(Australia) AUS	Medin Memeti	27	5	9+11	3	0+1	1	0	0	4+2	1
36	DF	(Australia) AUS	Harry Shillington	23	0	5+8	0	0	0	1	0	7+2	0
37	DF	(Australia) AUS	Peter Antoniou	13	1	0+8	1	0	0	0+1	0	0+4	0
38	MF	(Australia) AUS	Beckham Baker	12	0	0+7	0	0	0	1	0	2+2	0
39	MF	(Australia) AUS	Emin Durakovic	28	0	7+14	0	0	0	0	0	3+4	0
40	GK	(Australia) AUS	James Nieuwenhuizen	2	0	2	0	0	0	0	0	0	0
41	MF	(Australia) AUS	Lawrence Wong	10	0	0+8	0	0	0	0	0	0+2	0
44	DF	(Australia) AUS	Besian Kutleshi	15	0	4+6	0	1	0	0	0	0+4	0
45	DF	(Australia) AUS	Ryan Kalms	1	0	0	0	0	0	1	0	0	0
46	MF	(Australia) AUS	Akeem Gerald	2	0	0	0	0	0	0+1	0	0+1	0
47	MF	(Australia) AUS	Kavian Rahmani	28	2	10+7	2	0	0	1	0	7+3	0
48	DF	(Indonesia) IDN	Mathew Baker	1	0	0	0	0	0	1	0	0	0
52	MF	(New Zealand) NZL	Aaron Cartwright	1	0	0	0	0	0	0+1	0	0	0
53	MF	(Australia) AUS	Angus Mackintosh	1	0	0	0	0	0	1	0	0	0
60	GK	(Australia) AUS	Lachlan Charles	1	0	0	0	0	0	1	0	0	0
Player(s) transferred out but featured this season
27	MF	(Australia) AUS	Kai Trewin	19	0	13	0	0	0	0	0	6	0
42	MF	(Australia) AUS	Benjamin Dunbar	1	0	0	0	0	0	0+1	0	0	0
43	MF	(Australia) AUS	Marcus Humbert	1	0	0	0	0	0	1	0	0	0
44	MF	(Australia) AUS	Xavier Stella	1	0	0	0	0	0	0+1	0	0	0

=== Disciplinary record ===
Includes all competitions. The list is sorted by squad number when total cards are equal. Players with no cards not included in the list.

As of 2 May 2026

No.	Pos	Nat	Player	Total			A-League Men			A-League Men finals series			Australia Cup			AFC Champions League Elite		
No.	Pos	Nat	Player	Yellow card	Second yellow card	Red card	Yellow card	Second yellow card	Red card	Yellow card	Second yellow card	Red card	Yellow card	Second yellow card	Red card	Yellow card	Second yellow card	Red card
1	GK	(Australia) AUS	Patrick Beach	1	0	0	0	0	0	0	0	0	0	0	0	1	0	0
2	DF	(Australia) AUS	Harrison Delbridge	1	0	0	1	0	0	0	0	0	0	0	0	0	0	0
4	DF	(Australia) AUS	Liam Bonetig	1	0	0	0	0	0	0	0	0	0	0	0	1	0	0
10	FW	(Japan) JPN	Takeshi Kanamori	1	0	0	1	0	0	0	0	0	0	0	0	0	0	0
11	FW	(Kosovo) KOS	Elbasan Rashani	1	0	0	0	0	0	0	0	0	0	0	0	1	0	0
13	DF	(Australia) AUS	Nathaniel Atkinson	7	0	0	6	0	0	0	0	0	0	0	0	1	0	0
14	FW	(Australia) AUS	Daniel Arzani	1	0	0	1	0	0	0	0	0	0	0	0	0	0	0
16	DF	(Australia) AUS	Aziz Behich	7	0	0	5	0	0	0	0	0	0	0	0	2	0	0
17	FW	(Australia) AUS	Max Caputo	4	0	0	4	0	0	0	0	0	0	0	0	0	0	0
19	MF	(Australia) AUS	Zane Schreiber	4	0	0	3	0	0	0	0	0	0	0	0	1	0	0
22	DF	(Argentina) ARG	Germán Ferreyra	7	0	1	5	0	0	0	0	0	0	0	0	2	0	1
26	DF	(France) FRA	Samuel Souprayen	5	0	0	4	0	0	0	0	0	0	0	0	1	0	0
28	FW	(Australia) AUS	Marcus Younis	3	1	0	3	1	0	0	0	0	0	0	0	0	0	0
30	MF	(Austria) AUT	Andreas Kuen	7	0	0	7	0	0	0	0	0	0	0	0	0	0	0
35	FW	(Australia) AUS	Medin Memeti	2	0	0	2	0	0	0	0	0	0	0	0	0	0	0
37	DF	(Australia) AUS	Peter Antoniou	1	0	0	1	0	0	0	0	0	0	0	0	0	0	0
39	MF	(Australia) AUS	Emin Durakovic	1	0	0	1	0	0	0	0	0	0	0	0	0	0	0
44	DF	(Australia) AUS	Besian Kutleshi	3	0	0	2	0	0	0	0	0	0	0	0	1	0	0
47	MF	(Australia) AUS	Kavian Rahmaini	3	0	0	2	0	0	0	0	0	0	0	0	1	0	0
48	DF	(Indonesia) IDN	Mathew Baker	1	0	0	0	0	0	0	0	0	1	0	0	0	0	0
Player(s) transferred out but featured this season
27	MF	(Australia) AUS	Kai Trewin	1	0	0	0	0	0	0	0	0	0	0	0	1	0	0

- (yellow card) = Number of bookings; (second yellow card) = Number of sending offs after a second yellow card; (red card) = Number of sending offs by a direct red card.

=== Clean sheets ===
Includes all competitions. The list is sorted by squad number when total clean sheets are equal. Numbers in parentheses represent games where both goalkeepers participated and both kept a clean sheet; the number in parentheses is awarded to the goalkeeper who was substituted on, whilst a full clean sheet is awarded to the goalkeeper who was on the field at the start and end of play. Goalkeepers with no clean sheets not included in the list.

As of 2 May 2026

Rank	No.	Nat.	Goalkeeper	A-League Men	A-League Men finals series	Australia Cup	AFC Champions League Elite	Total
1	1	(Australia)	Patrick Beach	9	0	0	3	12
2	40	(Australia)	James Nieuwenhuizen	1	0	0	0	1
Total				10	0	0	3	13

== See also ==
- 2025–26 Melbourne City FC (women) season
