= 2024–25 Melbourne City FC season =

15th season in existence of Melbourne City FC

Melbourne City
2024–25 season
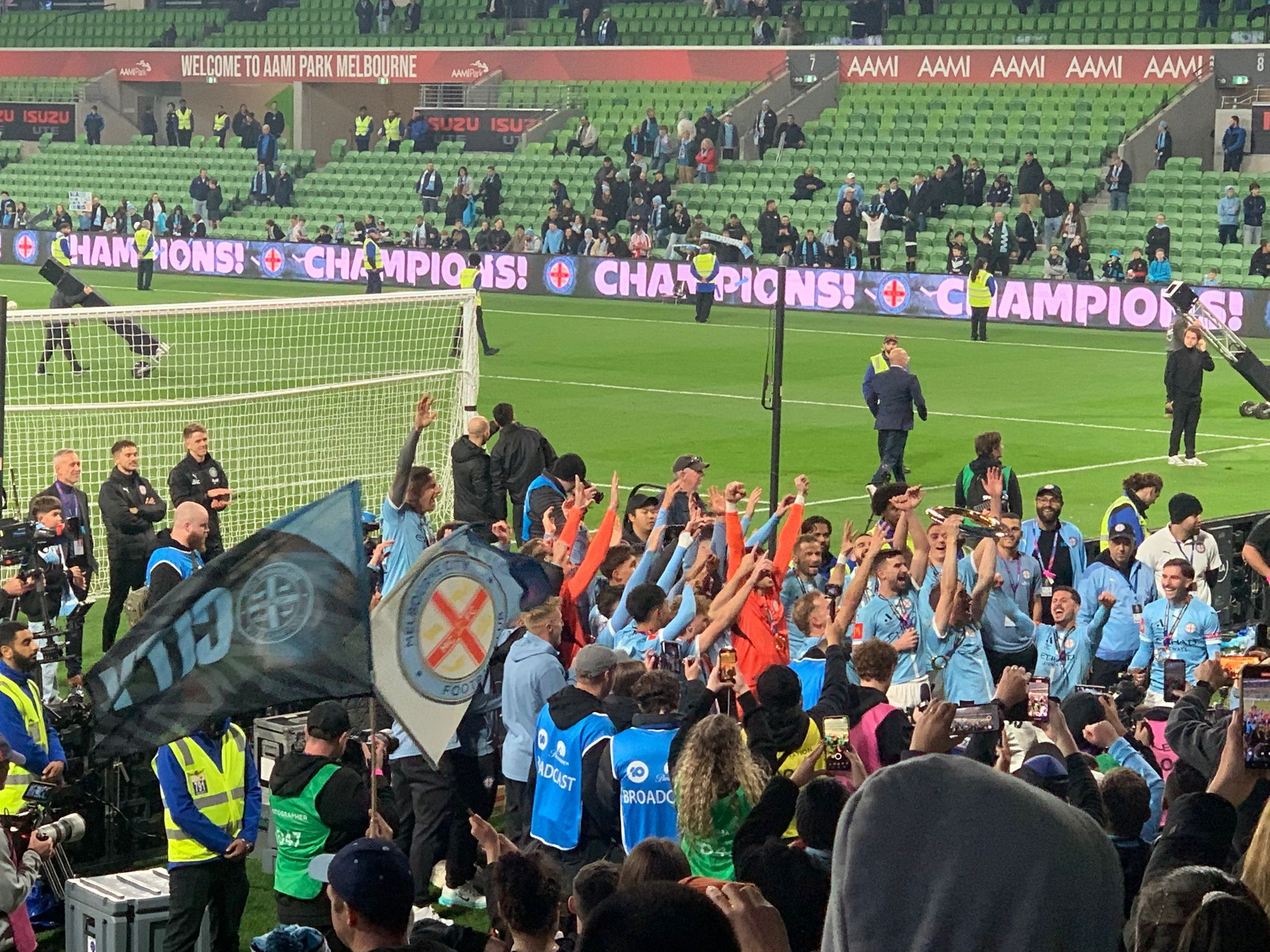
- Melbourne City players celebrating their 2024–25 A-League Men grand final win at AAMI Park.
- Owner: City Football Group
- Chairman: Khaldoon Al Mubarak
- Manager: Aurelio Vidmar
- Stadium: AAMI Park
- A-League Men: 2nd
- A-League Men finals series: Champions
- Australia Cup: Round of 32
- Top goalscorer: League: Max Caputo; Medin Memeti; Marco Tilio (5); All: Max Caputo; Yonatan Cohen (6)
- Highest home attendance: 29,902 vs. Melbourne Victory (31 May 2025); 2025 A-League Men Grand Final
- Lowest home attendance: 3,071 vs. Newcastle Jets (12 March 2025); A-League Men
- Average home league attendance: 6,300
- Biggest win: 5–0 vs. Perth Glory (A) (10 November 2024); A-League Men
- Biggest defeat: 3–0 vs. Auckland FC (A) (18 January 2025); A-League Men
Home colours	Away colours	Third colours
- All statistics correct as of 1 June 2025.

The 2024–25 season is Melbourne City Football Club's 15th season in the A-League Men; 11th since the club was taken over by the City Football Group. In addition to the domestic league, Melbourne City participated in this season's edition of the Australia Cup. The team is coached by Aurelio Vidmar after he was appointed as head coach on a full-time basis.

== Players ==
Note: Flags indicate national team as defined under FIFA eligibility rules; some limited exceptions apply. Players may hold more than one non-FIFA nationality.

No.	Pos.	Nation	Player
2	DF	AUS	Callum Talbot
6	MF	AUS	Steven Ugarkovic
7	FW	AUS	Mathew Leckie
8	MF	AUS	Jimmy Jeggo
10	FW	ISR	Yonatan Cohen
13	DF	AUS	Nathaniel Atkinson
15	FW	AUS	Andrew Nabbout
16	DF	AUS	Aziz Behich (captain)
17	FW	AUS	Max Caputo
18	GK	AUS	Dakota Ochsenham (injury replacement)
19	MF	AUS	Zane Schreiber
20	FW	AUS	Arion Sulemani
21	MF	AUS	Alessandro Lopane
22	DF	ARG	Germán Ferreyra

No.	Pos.	Nation	Player
23	FW	AUS	Marco Tilio (on loan from Celtic)
26	DF	FRA	Samuel Souprayen
27	DF	AUS	Kai Trewin
30	MF	AUT	Andreas Kuen
33	GK	AUS	Patrick Beach
34	DF	AUS	Jayden Necovski (scholarship)
35	FW	AUS	Medin Memeti
36	DF	AUS	Harry Shillington
37	DF	AUS	Peter Antoniou (scholarship)
38	DF	AUS	Harry Politidis
39	MF	AUS	Emin Durakovic
40	GK	AUS	James Nieuwenhuizen
41	MF	AUS	Lawrence Wong (scholarship)
46	FW	AUS	Benjamin Mazzeo

== Transfers and contracts ==
=== Transfers in ===
No.	Position	Player	Transferred from	Type/fee	Contract length	Date	Ref.
27	DF	Kai Trewin	Brisbane Roar	Free transfer	3 years	17 May 2024	
16	DF	Aziz Behich	(Saudi Arabia) Al Nassr	End of loan	(1 year)	30 June 2024	
22	DF	(Argentina) Germán Ferreyra	Unattached	Free transfer	2 years	17 July 2024	
30	MF	(Austria) Andreas Kuen	Unattached	Free transfer	2 years (Note: Option for an additional year.)	22 August 2024	
13	DF	Nathaniel Atkinson	(Scotland) Heart of Midlothian	Free transfer	3 years	16 September 2024	
10	FW	(Israel) Yonatan Cohen	Unattached	Free transfer	1 year	16 September 2024	
18	GK	Dakota Ochsenham	(Australia) Beograd	Injury replacement	9 months	17 April 2025	

==== From youth squad ====
No.	Position	Player	Age	Date	Notes	Ref.
35	FW	Medin Memeti	17	16 July 2024	3 year contract	
36	DF	Harry Shillington	19	26 July 2024	1 year contract	
41	MF	Lawrence Wong	17	31 July 2024	3 year scholarship contract	
37	DF	Peter Antoniou	17	1 August 2024	3 year scholarship contract	

=== Transfers out ===
No.	Position	Player	Transferred to	Type/fee	Date	Ref.
9	FW	Jamie Maclaren	(India) Mohun Bagan	End of contract	30 April 2024	
22	DF	Curtis Good	(Thailand) Buriram United	End of contract	1 May 2024	
11	FW	(Brazil) Léo Natel	(Brazil) Corinthians	End of loan	16 May 2024	
14	DF	(Chile) Vicente Fernández	Unattached	End of contract	16 May 2024	
17	MF	Terry Antonis	Unattached	End of contract	16 May 2024	
18	DF	Jordon Hall	Unattached	End of contract	16 May 2024	
44	FW	(Croatia) Marin Jakoliš	(France) Angers	End of loan	16 May 2024	
4	DF	(Portugal) Nuno Reis	Unattached	End of contract	7 June 2024	
2	DF	Scott Galloway	Auckland FC	Mutual contract termination	3 July 2024	
10	MF	(Germany) Tolgay Arslan	Unattached	Mutual contract termination	9 July 2024	
1	GK	(England) Jamie Young	Retired		6 February 2025	

=== Contract extensions ===
No.	Player	Position	Duration	Date	Notes
7	Matthew Leckie	FW	2 years	15 May 2024	
15	Andrew Nabbout	FW	2 years	15 May 2024	
1	(England) Jamie Young	GK	1 year	7 June 2024	
23	Marco Tilio	FW	1 year	4 July 2024	Loan extension
38	Harry Politidis	DF	1 year	24 July 2024	
16	Aziz Behich	DF	2 years	30 August 2024	Contract extended from end of 2024–25 to end of 2026–27

== Pre-season and friendlies ==
Win Draw Loss Fixtures

14 September 2024	Western United (Australia)	2–0	(Australia) Melbourne City	Melbourne
11:00 AEST	Ibusuki 29'; Lavale 71'	Report		Stadium: Ironbark Fields; Attendance: 0 (behind closed doors)

21 September 2024	Melbourne City (Australia)	3–1	(New Zealand) Auckland FC	Melbourne
	Nabbout (?); Memeti (?); Talbot (?)	Report	Gillion (?)	Stadium: CFA Melbourne; Attendance: 0 (behind closed doors)

6 October 2024	Melbourne City (Australia)	1–1	(Australia) Western United	Melbourne
	Jeggo (?)	Report	Garuccio (?)	Stadium: Casey Fields; Attendance: 0 (behind closed doors)

12 October 2024	Adelaide United (Australia)	1–0	(Australia) Melbourne City	Adelaide
	Mauk 87'	Report		Stadium: Coopers Stadium; Attendance: 0 (behind closed doors)

== Competitions ==
=== Overall record ===
Competition	First match	Last match	Starting round	Final position	Record							
Competition	First match	Last match	Starting round	Final position	Pld	W	D	L	GF	GA	GD	Win %
A-League Men	19 October 2024	3 May 2025	Matchday 1	2nd	26	14	6	6	41	25	+16	53.85
A-League Men Finals	9 May 2025	31 May 2025	Semi-finals	Winners	3	2	1	0	5	1	+4	66.67
Australia Cup	3 August 2024		Round of 32	Round of 32	1	0	0	1	4	5	−1	0.00
Total					30	16	7	7	50	31	+19	53.33

Last updated: 31 May 2025
Source: Soccerway

=== A-League Men ===
==== League table ====
Pos	Team	Pld	W	D	L	GF	GA	GD	Pts	Qualification
1	Auckland FC (Note: Auckland FC and Wellington Phoenix cannot qualify for Asian Football Confederation competitions as they are based in New Zealand, which is part of the Oceania Football Confederation.)	26	15	8	3	49	27	+22	53	Qualification for Finals series (Note: The top two teams enter the finals series at the semi-finals, while the teams ranked third to sixth enter the finals series at the elimination-finals.)
2	Melbourne City (C)	26	14	6	6	41	25	+16	48	Qualification for AFC Champions League Elite and Finals series
3	Western United	26	14	5	7	55	37	+18	47	Qualification for Finals series
4	Western Sydney Wanderers	26	13	7	6	58	40	+18	46	Qualification for Finals series
5	Melbourne Victory	26	12	7	7	44	36	+8	43	Qualification for Finals series

Source: A-Leagues
Rules for classification: 1) points; 2) goal difference; 3) goals scored; 4) wins; 5) head-to-head results; 5a) head-to-head points; 5b) head-to-head goal difference; 6) Fair Play points; 7) away goal difference; 8) away goals per match; 9) home goal difference; 10) home goals per match; 11) toss of a coin in an event of a tie of two clubs.
(C) Champions

==== Results summary ====
Overall								Home						Away					
Pld	W	D	L	GF	GA	GD	Pts	W	D	L	GF	GA	GD	W	D	L	GF	GA	GD
26	14	6	6	41	25	+16	48	8	2	3	20	11	+9	6	4	3	21	14	+7

Last updated: 3 May 2025.
Source: Ultimate A-League

==== Results by round ====
Round	1	2	3	4	5	6	7	8	9	10	11	12	17	13	15	16	18	19	20	21	22	14	23	24	25	26	27	28	29
Ground	A	H	A	A	B	H	A	H	A	B	A	H	H	H	A	A	A	H	A	A	H	H	B	A	H	H	A	H	H
Result	W	L	W	W	✖	L	W	D	D	✖	D	W	W	W	L	L	L	W	D	W	W	L	✖	W	W	W	D	D	W
Position	4	7	4	2	5	5	4	4	4	6	5	4	2	1	3	4	7	4	6	5	3	3	4	3	3	2	2	2	2
Points	3	3	6	9	9	9	12	13	14	14	15	18	21	24	24	24	24	27	28	31	34	34	34	37	40	43	44	45	48

Updated to match(es) played on 3 May 2025. Source: Ultimate A-League
A = Away; H = Home; B = Bye; W = Win; D = Draw; L = Loss

==== Matches ====
The league fixtures were announced on 2 August 2024.

19 October 2024 1	Newcastle Jets	0–1	Melbourne City	Newcastle
17:00 AEDT		Report	Tilio 2'	Stadium: McDonald Jones Stadium; Attendance: 8,032; Referee: Shaun Evans

26 October 2024 2	Melbourne City	1–3	Melbourne Victory	Melbourne
19:35 AEDT	Nabbout 64'	Report	Velupillay 5'; Vergos 12'; Teague 25'	Stadium: AAMI Park; Attendance: 20,093; Referee: Alex King

4 November 2024 3	Western United	0–1	Melbourne City	Melbourne
19:00 AEDT		Report	Nabbout 49'	Stadium: AAMI Park; Attendance: 4,325; Referee: Ben Abraham

10 November 2024 4	Perth Glory	0–5	Melbourne City	Perth
17:45 AWST		Report	Ugarkovic 39', 44'; Kuen 46'; Cohen 83'; Memeti 88'	Stadium: HBF Park; Attendance: 7,338; Referee: Daniel Cook

30 November 2024 6	Melbourne City	0–2	Western Sydney Wanderers	Melbourne
17:00 AEDT		Report	Milanovic 45' (pen.); Antonsson 81'	Stadium: AAMI Park; Attendance: 5,060; Referee: Jonathan Barreiro

6 December 2024 7	Brisbane Roar	1–4	Melbourne City	Brisbane
18:35 AEST	O'Shea 77' (pen.)	Report	Kuen 1'; Cohen 18', 70'; Ugarkovic 82'	Stadium: Suncorp Stadium; Attendance: 6,125; Referee: Sam Kelly

15 December 2024 8	Melbourne City	2–2	Auckland FC	Melbourne
17:00 AEDT	Memeti 18'; Pijnaker 79' (o.g.)	Report	May 53'; Moreno 90+5'	Stadium: AAMI Park; Attendance: 5,482; Referee: Ben Abraham

21 December 2024 9	Melbourne Victory	1–1	Melbourne City	Melbourne
19:35 AEDT	Miranda 65'	Report	Cohen 16'	Stadium: AAMI Park; Attendance: 24,053; Referee: Shaun Evans

31 December 2024 11	Central Coast Mariners	1–1	Melbourne City	Gosford
19:00 AEDT	Paull 68'	Report	Souprayen 33'	Stadium: Industree Group Stadium; Attendance: 11,542; Referee: Tim Danaskos

3 January 2025 12	Melbourne City	2–0	Wellington Phoenix	Melbourne
17:00 AEDT	Politidis 7'; Atkinson 83'	Report		Stadium: AAMI Park; Attendance: 5,129; Referee: Shaun Evans

7 January 2025 17	Melbourne City	2–0	Western United	Melbourne
18:00 AEDT	Politidis 32'; Mazzeo 59'	Report		Stadium: AAMI Park; Attendance: 5,018; Referee: Adam Bavcar

11 January 2025 13	Melbourne City	1–0	Brisbane Roar	Melbourne
17:00 AEDT	Mazzeo 65'	Report		Stadium: AAMI Park; Attendance: 4,683; Referee: Casey Reibelt

18 January 2025 15	Auckland FC	3–0	Melbourne City	Auckland
17:00 NZDT	May 32'; Pijnaker 40'; Mata 45+3'	Report		Stadium: Go Media Stadium; Attendance: 14,131; Referee: Ben Abraham

25 January 2025 16	Macarthur FC	1–0	Melbourne City	Sydney
19:35 AEDT	Germain 62'	Report		Stadium: Campbelltown Sports Stadium; Attendance: 3,843; Referee: Alex King

7 February 2025 18	Adelaide United	1–0	Melbourne City	Adelaide
19:05 ACDT	Goodwin 52'	Report		Stadium: Coopers Stadium; Attendance: 11,270; Referee: Ben Abraham

15 February 2025 19	Melbourne City	1–0	Perth Glory	Melbourne
17:00 AEDT	Wong 37'	Report		Stadium: AAMI Park; Attendance: 4,411; Referee: Nathan Shakespear

22 February 2025 20	Melbourne Victory	2–2	Melbourne City	Melbourne
19:35 AEDT	Machach 45+7' (pen.); Santos 48'	Report	Tilio 5'; Trewin 70' (pen.)	Stadium: AAMI Park; Attendance: 22,806; Referee: Jonathan Barreiro

28 February 2025 21	Wellington Phoenix	0–1	Melbourne City	Wellington
19:30 NZDT		Report	Tilio 51'	Stadium: Sky Stadium; Attendance: 5,716; Referee: Tim Danaskos

7 March 2025 22	Melbourne City	2–0	Macarthur FC	Melbourne
19:35 AEDT	Caputo 33', 74' (pen.)	Report		Stadium: AAMI Park; Attendance: 3,569; Referee: Ben Abraham

12 March 2025 14	Melbourne City	0–1	Newcastle Jets	Melbourne
19:00 AEDT		Report	Rose 69'	Stadium: AAMI Park; Attendance: 3,071; Referee: Sam Kelly

29 March 2025 24	Sydney FC	2–3	Melbourne City	Sydney
17:00 AEDT	Courtney-Perkins 28'; Costa 39'	Report	Memeti 5'; Caputo 35'; Lopane 61'	Stadium: Allianz Stadium; Attendance: 13,268; Referee: Adam Kersey

5 April 2025 25	Melbourne City	1–0	Central Coast Mariners	Melbourne
17:00 AEDT	Memeti 29'	Report		Stadium: AAMI Park; Attendance: 6,656; Referee: Lachlan Keevers

11 April 2025 26	Melbourne City	3–2	Brisbane Roar	Melbourne
19:35 AEDT	Tilio 57'; Caputo 61'; Ferreyra 85'	Report	Abubakar 9'; Jelacic 69'	Stadium: AAMI Park; Attendance: 6,052; Referee: Casey Reibelt

19 April 2025 27	Western Sydney Wanderers	2–2	Melbourne City	Sydney
19:35 AEDT	Milanovic 9'; Trewin 13' (o.g.)	Report	Trewin 36', 86' (pen.)	Stadium: CommBank Stadium; Attendance: 10,428; Referee: Adam Kersey

26 April 2025 28	Melbourne City	0–0	Adelaide United	Melbourne
19:35 AEDT		Report		Stadium: AAMI Park; Attendance: 5,128; Referee: Shaun Evans

3 May 2025 29	Melbourne City	5–1	Sydney FC	Melbourne
17:00 AEDT	Behich 5'; Caputo 26'; Tilio 34'; Kuen 57'; Memeti 90+5'	Report	Klimala 66'	Stadium: AAMI Park; Attendance: 6,098; Referee: Adam Kersey

==== Finals series ====
16 May 2025 Semi-final 1st leg	Western United	0–3	Melbourne City	Melbourne
19:35 AEST		Report	Ferreyra 16'; Cohen 54'; Leckie 72'	Stadium: AAMI Park; Attendance: 5,186; Referee: Shaun Evans

24 May 2025 Semi-final 2nd leg	Melbourne City	1–1 (4–1 agg.)	Western United	Melbourne
19:35 AEST	Behich 20'	Report	Botic 66'	Stadium: AAMI Park; Attendance: 7,691; Referee: Adam Kersey

31 May 2025 Grand Final	Melbourne City	1–0	Melbourne Victory	Melbourne
19:40 AEST	Cohen 10'	Report		Stadium: AAMI Park; Attendance: 29,902; Referee: Adam Kersey

=== Australia Cup ===
3 August 2024 Round of 32	Perth Glory	5–4 (a.e.t.)	Melbourne City	Perth
19:30 AWST	Faisal 3'; Taggart 47'; Blair 74', 114'; Bugarija 88'	Report	Caputo 36'; Politidis 52'; Nabbout 64'; Schreiber 69'	Stadium: Sam Kerr Football Centre; Attendance: 2,050; Referee: Alireza Faghani

== Statistics ==
=== Appearances and goals ===
Includes all competitions. Players with no appearances not included in the list.

As of 31 May 2025

No.	Pos	Nat	Player	Total		A-League Men		A-League Men Finals		Australia Cup	
No.	Pos	Nat	Player	Apps	Goals	Apps	Goals	Apps	Goals	Apps	Goals
Goalkeepers
33	GK	(Australia) AUS	Patrick Beach	29	0	26	0	3	0	0	0
40	GK	(Australia) AUS	James Nieuwenhuizen	1	0	0	0	0	0	1	0
Defenders
2	DF	(Australia) AUS	Callum Talbot	24	0	14+6	0	1+2	0	1	0
13	DF	(Australia) AUS	Nathaniel Atkinson	28	1	25+1	1	2	0	0	0
16	DF	(Australia) AUS	Aziz Behich	28	2	24	1	3	1	1	0
22	DF	(Argentina) ARG	Germán Ferreyra	25	2	13+8	1	3	1	0+1	0
26	DF	(France) FRA	Samuel Souprayen	22	1	20+1	1	0	0	1	0
27	DF	(Australia) AUS	Kai Trewin	28	3	24	3	3	0	1	0
38	DF	(Australia) AUS	Harry Politidis	23	3	11+11	2	0	0	1	1
Midfielders
6	MF	(Australia) AUS	Steven Ugarkovic	24	3	18+3	3	2+1	0	0	0
8	MF	(Australia) AUS	Jimmy Jeggo	5	0	3+1	0	0	0	1	0
19	MF	(Australia) AUS	Zane Schreiber	23	1	9+11	0	1+1	0	1	1
21	MF	(Australia) AUS	Alessandro Lopane	10	1	6	1	2+1	0	1	0
30	MF	(Austria) AUT	Andreas Kuen	21	3	17+1	3	3	0	0	0
39	MF	(Australia) AUS	Emin Durakovic	6	0	0+5	0	0	0	0+1	0
41	MF	(Australia) AUS	Lawrence Wong	16	1	4+10	1	0+1	0	0+1	0
42	MF	(Australia) AUS	Benjamin Dunbar	5	0	0+4	0	0	0	0+1	0
47	FW	(Australia) AUS	Kavian Rahmani	22	0	7+13	0	0+2	0	0	0
Forwards
7	FW	(Australia) AUS	Matthew Leckie	15	1	5+7	0	1+2	1	0	0
10	FW	(Israel) ISR	Yonatan Cohen	20	6	11+6	4	3	2	0	0
15	FW	(Australia) AUS	Andrew Nabbout	4	3	3	2	0	0	1	1
17	FW	(Australia) AUS	Max Caputo	16	6	12	5	3	0	1	1
20	FW	(Australia) AUS	Arion Sulemani	9	0	4+4	0	0	0	0+1	0
23	FW	(Australia) AUS	Marco Tilio	20	5	14+2	5	3	0	0+1	0
35	FW	(Australia) AUS	Medin Memeti	22	5	10+8	5	0+3	0	0+1	0
46	FW	(Australia) AUS	Benjamin Mazzeo	11	2	6+5	2	0	0	0	0
50	FW	(Australia) AUS	Mikey Ghossaini	8	0	0+8	0	0	0	0	0

=== Disciplinary record ===
Includes all competitions. The list is sorted by squad number when total cards are equal. Players with no cards not included in the list.

No.	Pos	Nat	Player	Total			A-League Men			A-League Men Finals			Australia Cup		
No.	Pos	Nat	Player	Yellow card	Second yellow card	Red card	Yellow card	Second yellow card	Red card	Yellow card	Second yellow card	Red card	Yellow card	Second yellow card	Red card
8	MF	(Australia) AUS	Jimmy Jeggo	1	0	1	0	0	1	0	0	0	1	0	0
13	DF	(Australia) AUS	Nathaniel Atkinson	8	0	0	7	0	0	1	0	0	0	0	0
6	MF	(Australia) AUS	Steven Ugarkovic	7	0	0	6	0	0	1	0	0	0	0	0
22	DF	(Argentina) ARG	Germán Ferreyra	6	0	0	4	0	0	2	0	0	0	0	0
27	DF	(Australia) AUS	Kai Trewin	6	0	0	6	0	0	0	0	0	0	0	0
19	MF	(Australia) AUS	Zane Schreiber	5	0	0	4	0	0	1	0	0	0	0	0
7	FW	(Australia) AUS	Mathew Leckie	4	0	0	2	0	0	2	0	0	0	0	0
16	DF	(Australia) AUS	Aziz Behich	4	0	0	3	0	0	1	0	0	0	0	0
2	DF	(Australia) AUS	Callum Talbot	3	0	0	3	0	0	0	0	0	0	0	0
10	FW	(Israel) ISR	Yonatan Cohen	3	0	0	2	0	0	1	0	0	0	0	0
23	FW	(Australia) AUS	Marco Tilio	3	0	0	1	0	0	1	0	0	1	0	0
17	FW	(Australia) AUS	Max Caputo	2	0	0	2	0	0	0	0	0	0	0	0
26	DF	(France) FRA	Samuel Souprayen	2	0	0	2	0	0	0	0	0	0	0	0
30	MF	(Austria) AUT	Andreas Kuen	2	0	0	2	0	0	0	0	0	0	0	0
33	GK	(Australia) AUS	Patrick Beach	2	0	0	2	0	0	0	0	0	0	0	0
38	DF	(Australia) AUS	Harry Politidis	2	0	0	1	0	0	0	0	0	1	0	0
41	MF	(Australia) AUS	Lawrence Wong	2	0	0	2	0	0	0	0	0	0	0	0
42	MF	(Australia) AUS	Benjamin Dunbar	1	0	0	1	0	0	0	0	0	0	0	0
47	MF	(Australia) AUS	Kavian Rahmani	1	0	0	1	0	0	0	0	0	0	0	0

- (yellow card) = Number of bookings; (second yellow card) = Number of sending offs after a second yellow card; (red card) = Number of sending offs by a direct red card.

=== Clean sheets ===
Includes all competitions. The list is sorted by squad number when total clean sheets are equal. Numbers in parentheses represent games where both goalkeepers participated and both kept a clean sheet; the number in parentheses is awarded to the goalkeeper who was substituted on, whilst a full clean sheet is awarded to the goalkeeper who was on the field at the start and end of play. Goalkeepers with no clean sheets not included in the list.

As of 31 May 2025

Rank	No.	Nat.	Goalkeeper	A-League Men	Finals series	Australia Cup	Total
1	33	(Australia)	Patrick Beach	11	2	0	13
Total				11	2	0	13

== See also ==
- 2024–25 Melbourne City FC (A-League Women) season
