= Mikey Ghossaini =

Soccer player (born 2007)

Personal information
- Full name: Michael Raef Ghossaini
- Date of birth: 25 August 2007 (age 19)
- Place of birth: Melbourne, Australia
- Height: 1.70 m (5 ft 7 in)
- Position: Forward

Team information
- Current team: Melbourne Victory
- Number: 29

Youth career
- 2017–2022: Football Technique School
- 2020–2022: Glen Eira
- 2023–2024: Melbourne City

Senior career*
Years	Team	Apps	(Gls)
2024–2026	Melbourne City Youth	23	(3)
2024–2026	Melbourne City	8	(0)
2026–	Melbourne Victory Youth	18	(17)
2026–	Melbourne Victory	2	(0)

International career^{‡}
2026–	Australia U20	3	(0)
- * Club domestic league appearances and goals as of 28 October 2026 ‡ National team caps and goals as of 6 September 2026

Michael Raef Ghossaini (born 25 August 2007) is an Australian professional soccer player who plays as a forward for Australian club Melbourne Victory.

== Early life ==
Ghossaini grew up in Melbourne, Australia, to Lebanese parents from Baakline. Growing up, he attended matches of Melbourne Heart FC and its successor club, Melbourne City FC, at the stadium.

== Club career ==
=== Youth ===
Ghossaini began his youth career at Football Technique School (FTS), a private academy linked to Glen Eira, joining at age 10 in late 2017. Between 2020 and 2022, he scored 93 goals in 59 National Premier Leagues matches for Glen Eira's U13, U14, and U15 teams.

Ahead of the 2023 season, Ghossaini transferred from Glen Eira to Melbourne City's youth academy. During the 2024 season, he finished top scorer in the U23 competition, scoring 22 goals in 17 matches. Over the course of 2023 and 2024, Ghossaini scored a combined 55 goals in various youth competitions for Melbourne City. He began training regularly with the first team during the 2024 season.

=== Melbourne City ===
Ghossaini made his first-team debut for Melbourne City in the A-League on 31 December 2024, appearing as a substitute in a 1–1 draw against the Central Coast Mariners. Three days later, on 3 January 2025, Ghossaini provided a backheel assist for Nathaniel Atkinson's goal against Wellington Phoenix, which was later awarded the A-League Assist of the Month for January 2025.

=== Melbourne Victory ===
In January 2026, Ghossaini joined Melbourne Victory's Victoria Premier League 1 (VPL1) team ahead of the 2026 season. He scored his first goal on 16 February 2026, in the season opener, helping his side win 2–1 against Eltham Redbacks. Ghossaini finished the season as the competition's top scorer with 18 goals.

Ghossaini signed his A-League contract with Victory on 2 July 2026, ahead of the 2026–27 season. He was subsequently included in Melbourne Victory's squad for its opening practice match of the season. On 8 August 2026, he scored the winning penalty in a penalty shoot-out against Western Sydney Wanderers, helping his side progress to the quarter-finals of the 2026 Australia Cup.

== International career ==
Born in Australia, Ghossaini is of Lebanese descent and is eligible to play for both Australia and Lebanon at the international level.

In 2022, he was named as a shadow-squad player for the Australia national under-16 team in preparation of the 2022 AFF U-16 Youth Championship in Indonesia. In 2024, Ghossaini received a call-up to the Lebanon national under-20 team, scoring in a 2–1 friendly win against an All-Stars Lebanese team. In August 2026, he was called up to the Australia national under-20 team ahead of the 2027 AFC U-20 Asian Cup qualifiers.

== Career statistics ==
As of match played 28 October 2026

Appearances and goals by club, season and competition
Club	Season	League			Australia Cup		Continental		Other		Total	
Club	Season	Division	Apps	Goals	Apps	Goals	Apps	Goals	Apps	Goals	Apps	Goals
Melbourne City Youth	2024	Victoria Premier League 1	5	0	—		—		—		5	0
Melbourne City Youth	2025	Victoria Premier League 1	18	3	—		—		—		18	3
Melbourne City Youth	Total		23	3	0	0	0	0	0	0	23	3
Melbourne City	2024–25	A-League	8	0	—		—		—		8	0
Melbourne City	2025–26	A-League	—		—		—		—		0	0
Melbourne City	Total		8	0	0	0	0	0	0	0	8	0
Melbourne Victory Youth	2026	Victoria Premier League 1	18	17	—		—		1 (Note: Appearance in VPL1 promotional play-offs)	0	19	17
Melbourne Victory	2026–27	A-League	2	0	4	0	3 (Note: Appearances in AFC Champions League Two)	0	—		9	0
Career total			51	20	4	0	3	0	1	0	59	20

== Honours ==
Individual

- Victoria Premier League 1 top scorer: 2026
