= Kavian Rahmani =

Australian soccer player (born 2006)

Kavian Rahmani کاویان رحمانی
Personal information
- Full name: Kavian Rahmani
- Date of birth: 29 December 2006 (age 19)
- Place of birth: Adelaide, South Australia, Australia
- Height: 1.78 m (5 ft 10 in)
- Position: Winger

Team information
- Current team: Melbourne City
- Number: 24

Youth career
- MetroStars
- Melbourne City

Senior career*
| Years | Team | Apps | (Gls) |
| 2024– | Melbourne City | 39 | (2) |

International career^{‡}
| 2024 | Australia U20 | 2 | (0) |
- * Club domestic league appearances and goals as of 20 December 2025 ‡ National team caps and goals as of 24 July 2024

Kavian Rahmani (born 29 December 2006; Persian: کاویان رحمانی) is an Australian professional soccer player who plays as a winger for Melbourne City in the A-League Men.

== Club career ==
Rahmani progressed through the Melbourne City Academy and signed a professional contract with the club in 2024. He made his senior debut during the 2024–25 season.

On 25 October 2025, Rahmani scored his first league goal in a 4–0 win against Perth Glory at AAMI Park during their league home opener of the 2025–26 season. At the end of the 2025–26 season, Rahmani received Melbourne City's Rising Star award.

== International career ==
Rahmani has represented Australia at the under-19 level.
