= Julio Cascante =

Costa Rican footballer (born 1993)

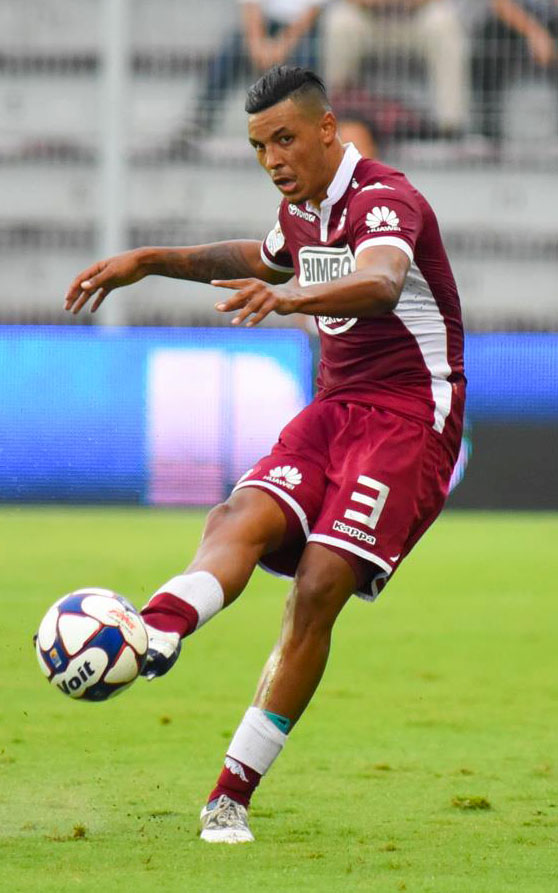
- Cascante with Saprissa in 2016

Personal information
- Full name: Julio César Cascante Solórzano
- Date of birth: October 3, 1993 (age 33)
- Place of birth: Puerto Limón, Costa Rica
- Height: 1.86 m (6 ft 1 in)
- Position: Centre-back

Team information
- Current team: Melbourne City
- Number: 18

Senior career*
Years	Team	Apps	(Gls)
2011–2012	Orión	11	(0)
2013–2016	UCR	42	(0)
2016–2017	Saprissa	54	(9)
2018–2020	Portland Timbers	48	(1)
2018	Portland Timbers 2	1	(0)
2021–2025	Austin FC	125	(9)
2026–	Melbourne City	0	(0)

International career^{‡}
2015	Costa Rica U22	3	(0)
2015	Costa Rica U23	3	(0)
2015–	Costa Rica	14	(1)
- * Club domestic league appearances and goals as of 19 September 2026 ‡ National team caps and goals as of 9 September 2025 (UTC)

Julio César Cascante Solórzano (born 3 October 1993) is a Costa Rican professional footballer who plays as a centre-back for Melbourne City in the A-League Men and the Costa Rica national team.

== Club career ==
Cascante started his career at Orión in 2011, before transferring to UCR for a three-year stint. Cascante signed with Saprissa for the second half of the 2016 season, helping the team earn their 33rd league title. He also made five appearances in the CONCACAF Champions League during his time with Saprissa.

After starting his career in his native Costa Rica, Cascante signed with MLS side Portland Timbers on 2 January 2018. Cascante helped the team return to the MLS Cup final before falling to Atlanta United 0–2.

Cascante was traded from Portland Timbers to MLS expansion side Austin FC in exchange for $250,000 in general allocation money on December 13, 2020. In April 2023, Austin FC extended Cascante's contract through the 2025 season, with a 1-year club option for 2026.

On 17 September 2026, Cascante joined A-League Men club Melbourne City ahead of the 2026–27 season on a one-year deal with an option for a further season.

== International career ==
Cascante was first called up for the Costa Rica national football team for the 2015 Olympic qualifying. Starting in 2023, Cascante became a regular on the Costa Rica national football team, making appearances in friendlies, CONCACAF Nations League, and 2024 Copa América.

== Career statistics ==
=== Club ===
As of 2 November 2025

Appearances and goals by club, season and competition
Club	Season	League			League Cup		National Cup (Note: Appearance(s) in U.S. Open Cup)		Continental		Other		Total	
Club	Season	Division	Apps	Goals	Apps	Goals	Apps	Goals	Apps	Goals	Apps	Goals	Apps	Goals
Orión	2011–12	Primera División	11	0	—		—		—		—		11	0
Orión	Club Total		11	0	—		0	0	0	0	—		11	0
UCR	2013–14	Primera División	7	0	—		—		—		—		7	0
UCR	2014–15	Liga FPD	34	0	—		—		—		—		34	0
UCR	2015–16	Liga FPD	1	0	—		—		—		—		1	0
UCR	Club Total		42	0	—		0	0	0	0	—		42	0
Saprissa	2016–17	Liga FPD	34	3	—		—		5 (Note: Appearance(s) in CONCACAF Champions Cup)	0	—		39	3
Saprissa	2017–18	Liga FPD	20	6	—		—		—		—		20	6
Saprissa	Club Total		54	9	—		0	0	5	0	—		59	9
Portland Timbers 2	2018	USL Championship	1	0	—		—		—		—		1	0
Portland Timbers 2	Club Total		1	0	—		0	0	0	0	0	0	1	0
Portland Timbers	2018	MLS	21	0	—		1	1	0	0	—		22	1
Portland Timbers	2019	MLS	22	0	—		2	0	0	0	—		24	0
Portland Timbers	2020	MLS	5	1	—		—		0	0	—		5	1
Portland Timbers	Club Total		48	1	—		3	1	0	0	—		51	2
Austin FC	2021	MLS	31	2	—		—		—		—		31	2
Austin FC	2022	MLS	32	3	3 (Note: Appearance(s) in MLS Cup Playoffs)	0	1	0	—		—		36	3
Austin FC	2023	MLS	24	2	—		2	0	0	0	2 (Note: Appearance(s) in Leagues Cup)	0	28	2
Austin FC	2024	MLS	25	2	—		—		—		2	0	27	2
Austin FC	2025	MLS	13	0	2	0	4	0	—		—		19	0
Austin FC	Club Total		125	9	5	0	7	0	0	0	4	0	141	9
Melbourne City	2026–27	A-League Men	0	0	—		—		—		0	0	0	0
Career total			281	19	5	0	10	1	5	0	4	0	305	20

=== International ===
As of match played 9 September 2025

Costa Rica
Year	Apps	Goals
2015	1	0
2023	3	1
2024	9	0
2025	1	0
Total	14	1

Scores and results list Costa Rica's goal tally first.

List of international goals scored by Julio Cascante
No.	Date	Venue	Opponent	Score	Result	Competition
1	12 September 2023	Stadion Maksimir, Zagreb, Croatia	United Arab Emirates	1–4	1–4	International Friendly

== Honours ==
Saprissa

- Liga FPD: 2016–17
