= Harry Shillington =

Australian soccer player

Harrison Shillington
Personal information
- Full name: Harrison Thomas Shillington
- Date of birth: June 30, 2005 (age 21)
- Place of birth: Melbourne, Victoria, Australia
- Height: 1.76 m (5 ft 9 in)
- Position: Right-back

Team information
- Current team: Melbourne Victory
- Number: 36

Youth career
- Melbourne City Youth

Senior career*
Years	Team	Apps	(Gls)
2024–2026	Melbourne City	13	(0)
2026–	Melbourne Victory	0	(0)

International career^{‡}
2023–	Australia U18	2	(0)
2023–	Australia U20	1	(0)
- * Club domestic league appearances and goals as of 8 May 2025 ‡ National team caps and goals as of 8 May 2025

Harrison Thomas Shillington (born 30 June 2005) is an Australian professional footballer who plays as a right-back for Melbourne Victory in the A-League Men. He has previously played for A-League Men club Melbourne City

== Club career ==
=== Melbourne City ===
Shillington joined the Melbourne City Academy in 2017 at the age of 12 and signed his first professional contract with the club in July 2024. Shillington made his club debut in the 2023 Australia Cup against North Eastern MetroStars in the quarter-finals. He would later make his AFC Champions League Elite debut on 16 September 2025 followed up by his A-League Men debut in the first round of the 2025-26 season against the Western Sydney Wanderers on 18 October 2025. On 4 June 2026 it would be announced that Shillington would leave Melbourne City.

=== Melbourne Victory ===
After his departure from Melbourne City, Shillington joined local rivals, Melbourne Victory, on 5 July 2026, signing a two-year deal with the club.

== International career ==
Shillington has represented Australia at the under-20 level.

== Career statistics ==
As of 6 July 2026

Club	Season	League			National cup		Other		Total	
Club	Season	Division	Apps	Goals	Apps	Goals	Apps	Goals	Apps	Goals
Melbourne City Youth	2022	NPL Victoria 3	9	0	0	0	0	0	9	0
Melbourne City Youth	2023	NPL Victoria 2	20	2	0	0	0	0	20	2
Melbourne City Youth	2024	Victorian Premier League	18	2	0	0	3	0	21	2
Melbourne City Youth	2025	Victorian Premier League	13	0	0	0	0	0	13	0
Melbourne City Youth	2026	NPL Victoria	3	1	0	0	0	0	3	1
Melbourne City Youth	Total		63	5	0	0	3	0	66	5
Melbourne City	2023–24	A-League Men	0	0	1	0	0	0	1	0
Melbourne City	2024–25	A-League Men	0	0	0	0	0	0	0	0
Melbourne City	2025–26	A-League Men	13	0	1	0	9	0	23	0
Melbourne City	Total		13	0	2	0	9	0	24	0
Melbourne Victory	2026–27	A-League Men	0	0	0	0	0	0	0	0
Total			76	5	2	0	9	0	87	0

Ref:
