= Patrick Beach =

Australian soccer player (born 2003)

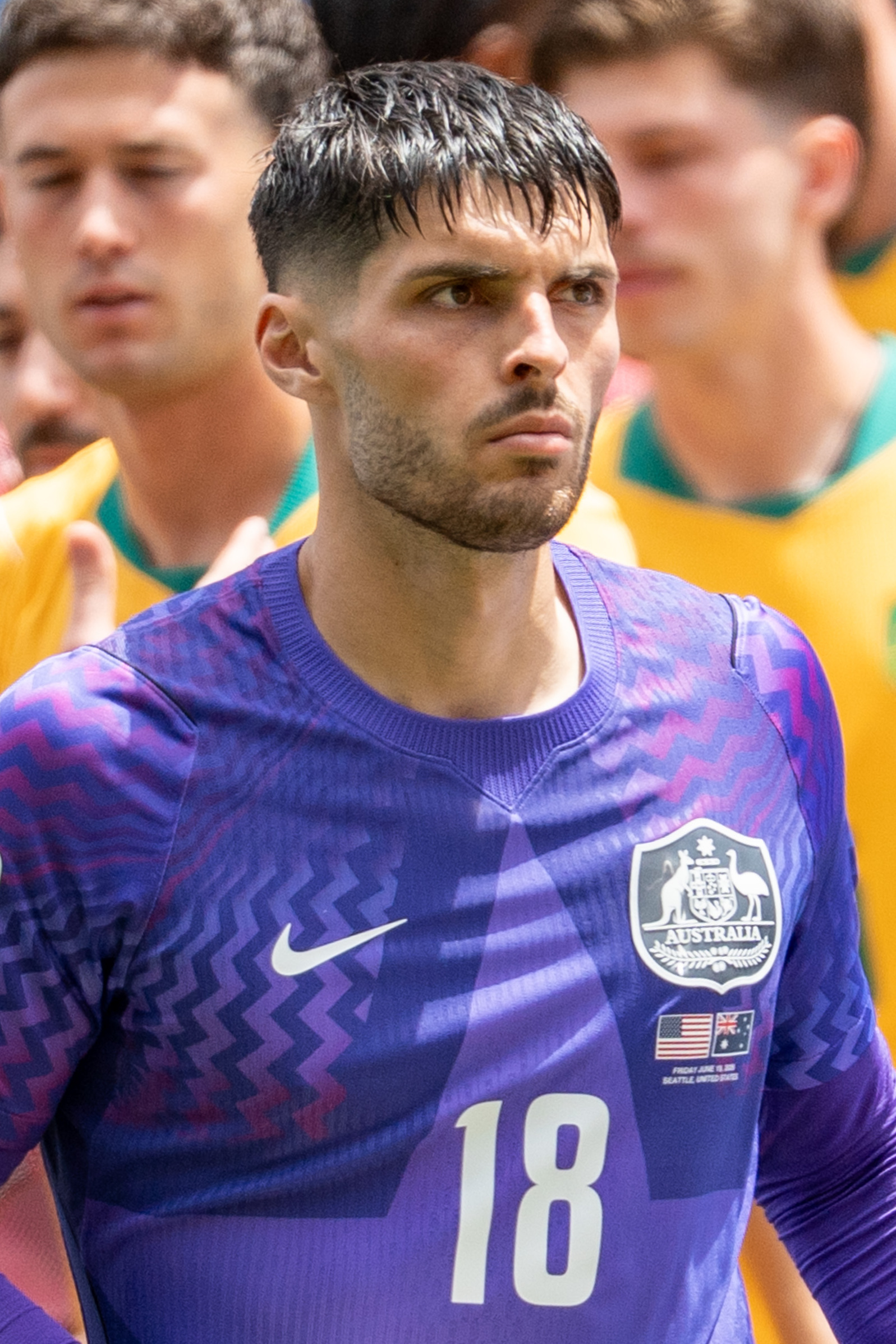
- Beach with Australia in 2026

Personal information
- Full name: Patrick Thomas Beach
- Date of birth: 6 August 2003 (age 23)
- Place of birth: Sydney, New South Wales, Australia
- Height: 1.90 m (6 ft 3 in)
- Position: Goalkeeper

Team information
- Current team: Troyes
- Number: 33

Youth career
- 2007–2011: Glenmore Park FC
- 2012–2018: Mt Druitt Town Rangers
- 2018–2019: Marconi Stallions
- 2021: Dundalk
- 2021–2023: Central Coast Mariners

Senior career*
Years	Team	Apps	(Gls)
2021–2023	Central Coast Mariners NPL	15	(0)
2021–2023	Central Coast Mariners	0	(0)
2023	Melbourne City NPL	6	(0)
2023–2026	Melbourne City	53	(0)
2026–	Troyes	7	(0)

International career^{‡}
2024–	Australia U23	11	(0)
2025–	Australia	6	(0)
Medal record
Men's football
Representing Australia
WAFF U23 Championship
Runner-up	2024 Saudi Arabia
- * Club domestic league appearances and goals as of 17 October 2026 ‡ National team caps and goals as of 3 July 2026

Patrick Thomas Beach (born 6 August 2003) is an Australian professional soccer player who plays as a goalkeeper for Ligue 1 club Troyes and the Australia national team.

In October 2021, Beach joined the A-League side Central Coast Mariners, before moving to Melbourne City in 2023. During his debut in the 2024–25 A-League Men season, Beach played in all regular season and finals fixtures, culminating in a grand final win with his team and becoming an A-League Championship winner at 21 years of age.

Beach made his senior Australia national team debut on 14 November 2025 against Venezuela, receiving the Player of the Match, and started in all four of Australia's matches at the 2026 FIFA World Cup.

== Club career ==
=== Early career ===
Beach was born on 6 August 2003 in Sydney. He joined League of Ireland club Dundalk, where he played for their under-19 side for six months. He returned to Australia in October 2021 to join the Central Coast Mariners. He was on the bench in two league matches for them in January 2022 and joined the roster for the 2021 FFA Cup final, but did not make an appearance during his stint with the club.

=== Melbourne City ===
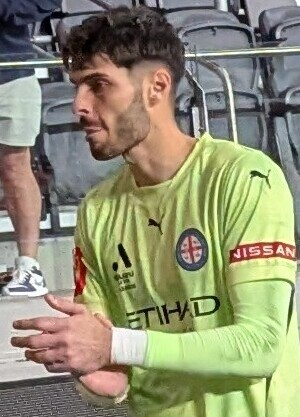
Beach with Melbourne City in 2025

Beach signed for Melbourne City on 23 June 2023 on a three-year deal, and was benched for the entire 2023–24 A-League Men campaign. In the next season in 2024–25, he made his professional debut with Melbourne City on 19 October 2024 starting and keeping a clean sheet against the Newcastle Jets in a 1–0 win, earning him the Man of the Match on debut. Manager Aurelio Vidmar explained the decision to start Beach ahead of regular goalkeeper Jamie Young by saying that it was the time to give the younger player the opportunity. Beach played every minute of the season, leading to Young retiring in February 2025. Beach finished the 2024–25 A-League season playing all 29 games for Melbourne City, with 13 clean sheets.

=== Troyes ===
On 19 July 2026, Beach signed a five-year contract with Troyes in the French top tier. Beach made his Ligue 1 debut in the opening round of the 2026–27 season, keeping a clean sheet in a 0–0 draw with Paris FC.

== International career ==
Beach was called up to represent the Australia U23 at the 2024 AFC U-23 Asian Cup donning caps in all three group games. He was then called up to the Australia U-23s for the Pacific Aus Sports Football Series in October 2024.

Beach was called up by Australian men's team coach Tony Popovic as a training player during the 2025 camp in Sydney. He received a call-up to the team in November 2025 for two friendly games against Venezuela and Colombia in the United States. He became Socceroo number #654 by starting in the game against Venezuela on 14 November at Shell Stadium, Houston, a 0–1 loss. Beach was named Player of the Match by Football Australia.

On 31 May 2026, Beach was selected in the 26-man squad for the 2026 FIFA World Cup. On 13 June 2026, he started in 2026 FIFA World Cup opener for the Socceroos' against Turkey. He was selected ahead of more experienced goalkeepers Mathew Ryan and Paul Izzo, and confirmed to be the youngest starting goalkeeper of the tournament. He made eight saves during the match, keeping a clean sheet in a 2–0 victory.

On 4 July 2026, Beach was substituted out for the penalty shootout for Mathew Ryan as Australia lost to Egypt.

== Personal life ==
On 26 June 2026, in the midst of Australia's 2026 FIFA World Cup campaign, the City of Port Philip temporarily renamed St Kilda Beach as Patrick Beach in honour of his performance at the tournament.

== Career statistics ==
=== Club ===
As of match played 17 October 2026

Appearances and goals by club, season and competition
Club	Season	League			Cup (Note: Includes appearances in the Australia Cup)		Continental		Total	
Club	Season	Division	Apps	Goals	Apps	Goals	Apps	Goals	Apps	Goals
Central Coast Mariners	2021–22	A-League Men	0	0	0	0	—		0	0
Central Coast Mariners NPL	2023	NPL NSW	15	0	—		—		15	0
Melbourne City NPL	2023	NPL Victoria 2	1	0	—		—		1	0
Melbourne City NPL	2024	VPL 1	5	0	—		—		5	0
Melbourne City NPL	Total		6	0	—		—		6	0
Melbourne City	2023–24	A-League Men	0	0	0	0	0	0	0	0
Melbourne City	2024–25	A-League Men	29	0	0	0	—		29	0
Melbourne City	2025–26	A-League Men	24	0	0	0	10 (Note: Appearances in AFC Champions League Elite)	0	34	0
Melbourne City	Total		53	0	0	0	10	0	63	0
Troyes	2026–27	Ligue 1	7	0	0	0	—		7	0
Career total			81	0	0	0	10	0	91	0

=== International ===
As of match played 3 July 2026

Appearances and goals by national team and year
National team	Year	Apps	Goals
Australia U23	2023	2	0
Australia U23	2024	4	0
Australia U23	2025	5	0
Australia	2025	1	0
Australia	2026	5	0

== Honours ==
Melbourne City

- A-League: 2024–25 Championship Winner

Australia U-23

- WAFF U-23 Championship: runner-up 2024
