= Nathaniel Atkinson =

Australian soccer player (born 1999)

- Atkinson with Melbourne City in 2019

Personal information
- Full name: Nathaniel Caleb Atkinson
- Date of birth: 13 June 1999 (age 27)
- Place of birth: Launceston, Tasmania, Australia
- Height: 1.81 m (5 ft 11 in)
- Position: Right-back

Team information
- Current team: Melbourne City
- Number: 13

Youth career
- Riverside Olympic
- FFT NTC

Senior career*
Years	Team	Apps	(Gls)
2017	Melbourne City NPL	23	(4)
2017–2022	Melbourne City	75	(4)
2022–2024	Heart of Midlothian	52	(2)
2024–	Melbourne City	49	(1)

International career^{‡}
2018	Australia U20	3	(1)
2019–2022	Australia U23	7	(0)
2022–	Australia	13	(0)
- * Club domestic league appearances and goals as of 5 May 2024 ‡ National team caps and goals as of 25 March 2024

Nathaniel Caleb Atkinson (born 13 June 1999) is an Australian professional soccer player who plays as a right-back for Melbourne City and the Australia national team.

== Club career ==
=== Early career ===
Born in Launceston, Tasmania, Atkinson was part of the youth setup at Riverside Olympic before joining the NTC program at Football Tasmania. In 2016, Atkinson joined the Melbourne City academy after a successful trial with the club. He played with the Melbourne City NPL side in the NPL Victoria from 2016 to 2017. Towards the end of the 2016–17 season, Atkinson began training with the Melbourne City first team.

=== Melbourne City ===
Going into the 2017–18 season, Atkinson was given the 37 shirt. He made his competitive debut for the first team in a FFA Cup match against Peninsula Power at Dolphin Oval on 1 August 2017. He came on as a late stoppage time substitute for Bruno Fornaroli as Melbourne City won the match 2–0. On 10 December 2017, due to the suspension of Melbourne City's regular right-back Manny Muscat, Atkinson made his A-League debut for the club against the Central Coast Mariners. Despite being named as a right back before the match, Atkinson played the match as a right winger as Melbourne City managed to win 1–0. After the match, Melbourne City head coach Warren Joyce praised Atkinson, saying "I thought he took his opportunity well. He’s one that caught my eye as soon as I came to the club."

On 12 January 2018, after a promising start, Atkinson signed a two-year senior contract with Melbourne City.

In September 2020, Atkinson signed a two-year contract with Perth Glory. However, three weeks later, his contract was terminated due to the COVID-19 pandemic situation, allowing him to sign another two-year contract with Melbourne City.

=== Heart of Midlothian ===
On 24 December 2021, Atkinson signed a three-and-a-half-year contract with Scottish Premiership club Heart of Midlothian, with the deal going through on 10 January 2022.

=== Return to Melbourne City ===
Atkinson re-joined Melbourne City on a three year contract ahead of the 2024-25 season.

== International career ==
In January 2017, Atkinson was selected to train with the Australia U20 side.

In November 2019 he was one of four players suspended by the Australia U23 due to "unprofessional conduct".

Atkinson qualified for the Tokyo 2020 Olympics. He was part of the Olyroos Olympic squad. The team beat Argentina in their first group match but were unable to win another match. They were therefore not in medal contention.

He was called up to the senior Australia squad for the 2022 FIFA World Cup qualifiers on 24 and 29 March 2022.

Atkinson was named in Australia's squad for the 2022 FIFA World Cup in November 2022.

== Honours ==
Melbourne City

- A-League Men Premiership: 2020–21
- A-League Men Championship: 2021

Individual

- Joe Marston Medal: 2021

== Career statistics ==
=== Club ===
As of 10 October 2026

Appearances and goals by club, season and competition
Club	Season	League			National cup (Note: Includes FFA Cup, Scottish FA Cup)		League cup		Continental		Total	
Club	Season	Division	Apps	Goals	Apps	Goals	Apps	Goals	Apps	Goals	Apps	Goals
Melbourne City NPL	2017	NPL Victoria 2	23	4	—		—		—		23	4
Melbourne City	2017–18	A-League	17	0	1	0	—		—		18	0
Melbourne City	2018–19	A-League	17	0	3	0	—		—		20	0
Melbourne City	2019–20	A-League	23	1	0	0	—		—		23	1
Melbourne City	2020–21	A-League	14	2	—		—		—		14	2
Melbourne City	2021–22	A-League	4	1	1	0	—		—		5	0
Melbourne City	Total		75	4	5	0	—		—		80	4
Heart of Midlothian	2021–22	Scottish Premiership	15	1	5	0	—		—		20	1
Heart of Midlothian	2022–23	Scottish Premiership	18	1	3	0	0	0	5 (Note: One appearance in UEFA Europa League; four appearances, one goal in UEFA Conference League)	1	26	2
Heart of Midlothian	2023–24	Scottish Premiership	19	0	3	0	0	0	4 (Note: Appearances in UEFA Conference League)	0	26	0
Heart of Midlothian	Total		52	2	11	0	0	0	9	1	72	3
Melbourne City	2024–25	A-League	28	1	0	0	—		—		28	1
Melbourne City	2025–26	A-League	22	0	0	0	—		8 (Note: Appearances in AFC Champions League Elite)	0	30	0
Melbourne City	2026–27	A-League	0	0	2	0	—		—		2	0
Melbourne City	Total		50	1	2	0	0	0	8	0	60	0
Career total			200	11	18	0	0	0	17	1	235	11

=== International ===
Australia
Year	Apps	Goals
2022	6	0
2023	2	0
2024	5	0
Total	13	0

== See also ==
- List of foreign Scottish Premiership players
