= Harry Politidis =

Australian professional soccer player (born 1996)

Personal information
- Full name: Harry Alexandros Politidis
- Date of birth: 28 July 2002 (age 24)
- Place of birth: Melbourne, Victoria, Australia
- Height: 1.76 m (5 ft 9 in)
- Position: Left back

Team information
- Current team: Macarthur FC
- Number: 19

Youth career
- 2017–2023: Melbourne City

Senior career*
Years	Team	Apps	(Gls)
2019–2025	Melbourne City NPL	51	(6)
2023–2025	Melbourne City	23	(2)
2025–	Macarthur FC	11	(0)
- * Club domestic league appearances and goals as of 25 April 2026

Harry Alexandros Politidis (Greek: [aˈleksandros poliˈtidis]; born 28 July 2002) is an Australian soccer player playing as a left back for A-League Men club Macarthur FC.

== Early life ==
Politidis was born on 28 July 2002 in Melbourne, Victoria. He is of Greek descent.

== Club career ==
Politidis rose through the Melbourne City youth ranks from the age of 15, where he would eventually captain the side. He made his full senior debut against Sydney FC during the 2023 Australia Cup, and would later be rewarded with his first professional contract with the senior team.
