= Mathew Baker (footballer) =

Indonesian footballer

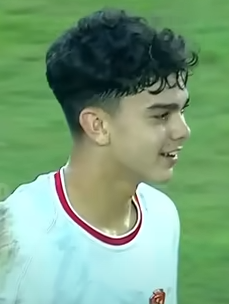
- Baker with Indonesia in 2024

Personal information
- Full name: Mathew Ryan Baker
- Date of birth: 13 May 2009 (age 17)
- Place of birth: Melbourne, Australia
- Height: 1.76 m (5 ft 9 in)
- Position: Defender

Team information
- Current team: Melbourne City
- Number: 36

Youth career
- 2016–2017: Malvern City
- 2018–2021: Box Hill United
- 2021–2025: Melbourne City

Senior career*
Years	Team	Apps	(Gls)
2025–	Melbourne City NPL	18	(0)
2025–	Melbourne City	0	(0)

International career^{‡}
2024–2026	Indonesia U17	20	(2)
2026–	Indonesia U20	2	(0)
2026–	Indonesia	1	(0)
- * Club domestic league appearances and goals as of 20 February 2026 ‡ National team caps and goals as of 13 June 2026

Mathew Ryan Baker (born 13 May 2009) is a professional footballer who plays as a defender for A-League club Melbourne City. Born in Australia, he plays for the Indonesia national team.

== Early life ==
Mathew Ryan Baker was born on 13 May 2009 in Melbourne, Australia, to an Indonesian mother and an Australian father. Baker joined Malvern City youth academy in 2016.

== Club career ==
=== Melbourne City ===
In 2021 Baker joined Melbourne City youth academy. On 2 March 2025, Baker made his debut for Melbourne City's VPL side, starting in a 8–1 win against Moreland City. Baker made his first team debut for Melbourne City on 30 July 2025 in an Australia Cup match against APIA Leichhardt. On 30 September 2025, Baker signed his first professional contract with the club on a three-year deal.

On 14 September 2025, Baker played the full 120 minutes as a left-back for Melbourne City Youth in a promotion play-off match against Brunswick City SC, which ended 2–2 after extra time. Melbourne City won the penalty shoot-out 3–1 and secured promotion to the NPL Victoria. On 16 September 2025, Baker was included in City's squad for an AFC Champions League Elite fixture against Sanfrecce Hiroshima, remaining an unused substitute in a 2–0 defeat. He was again named as an unused substitute for City away to Vissel Kobe on 1 October.

== International career ==
Born in Australia, Baker is of Indonesian descent and is eligible to play for both Australia and Indonesia at the international level. In 2024, Baker was called up to the Indonesia under-16 team for the 2024 ASEAN U-16 Boys Championship. In the semi-finals, he started and played against his birth country, Australia, where his team lost 5–3. Indonesia would eventually finish 3rd in the competition.

In August 2024, Baker received a call-up to the Australia U17 team in preparation for the 2025 AFC U-17 Asian Cup qualification. However, Baker declined the invitation and chose to continue representing Indonesia. During the qualification campaign, he helped Indonesia secure a spot in the final tournament by scoring the only goal in a victory over Kuwait. He also faced Australia again in the same qualifying tournament, with the match ending in a 0–0 draw.

At the 2025 AFC U-17 Asian Cup, Baker played a key role in helping Indonesia reach the knockout stage of the tournament and secure qualification for the 2025 FIFA U-17 World Cup. On 4 November 2025, Baker made his U17 World Cup debut, by starting in a 1–3 defeat against Zambia. In the final group stage match, Baker was named in the starting lineup as Indonesia claimed a historic 2–1 victory over Honduras, their first win in a FIFA World Cup tournament.

On 5 June 2026, Baker made his debut for the Indonesia senior team in a friendly match against Oman. He became the youngest debutant to play for the senior team at the age of 17 years and 29 days old.

== Career statistics ==
=== Club ===
As of match played 6 September 2025

Appearances and goals by club, season and competition
Club	Season	League			Cup		Continental		Other		Total	
Club	Season	Division	Apps	Goals	Apps	Goals	Apps	Goals	Apps	Goals	Apps	Goals
Melbourne City NPL	2025	Victoria Premier League 1	16	0	–		–		–		16	0
Melbourne City NPL	2026	NPL Victoria	2	0	–		–		–		2	0
Melbourne City	2025–26	A-League	0	0	1	0	0	0	0	0	1	0
Career Total			18	0	1	0	0	0	0	0	19	0

=== International ===
As of match played 5 June 2026

Appearances and goals by national team and year
National team	Year	Apps	Goals
Indonesia	2026	1	0
Total		1	0

== Honours ==
Indonesia U16

- ASEAN U-16 Boys Championship third-place: 2024

Indonesia U19

- ASEAN U-19 Boys Championship third-place: 2026
