= Max Caputo =

Australian soccer player

Personal information
- Date of birth: 17 August 2005 (age 21)
- Place of birth: Melbourne, Victoria, Australia
- Height: 1.86 m (6 ft 1 in)
- Position: Striker

Team information
- Current team: Melbourne City
- Number: 9

Youth career
- Essendon Royals
- Sunshine George Cross
- 2018–2021: Melbourne City

Senior career*
Years	Team	Apps	(Gls)
2021–	Melbourne City NPL	41	(27)
2021–	Melbourne City	69	(15)

International career^{‡}
2022–	Australia U20	10	(7)
- * Club domestic league appearances and goals as of 2 May 2026 ‡ National team caps and goals as of 6 October 2025

Max Caputo (Italian: [kaˈpuːto]; born 17 August 2005) is an Australian professional soccer player who plays as a striker for Melbourne City.

== Career ==
=== Melbourne City ===
On 23 April 2021, Caputo earned a scholarship contract at A-League club Melbourne City after spending four years in their youth setup. After some first-team players had left their squad during the 2020–21 season, it was rumoured that Max Caputo would fill into their squad in a Melbourne Derby. At age 15, Caputo made his senior professional debut on 6 June 2021 against Melbourne Victory as a substitute. He had his second appearance in the A-League at the age of 17 on 2 April 2023 when he was substituted in the 90th minute and scored the equaliser two minutes later, becoming Melbourne City's youngest ever goalscorer in the league.

== Career statistics ==
As of 3 August 2024

Appearances and goals by club, season and competition
Club	Season	League			National cup		Asia		Other		Total	
Club	Season	Division	Apps	Goals	Apps	Goals	Apps	Goals	Apps	Goals	Apps	Goals
Melbourne City NPL	2021	NPL Victoria 3	13	12	—		—		—		13	12
Melbourne City NPL	2022	NPL Victoria 3	13	9	—		—		—		13	9
Melbourne City NPL	2023	NPL Victoria 2	10	3	—		—		—		10	3
Melbourne City NPL	2024	Victoria Premier League 1	5	3	—		—		—		5	3
Melbourne City NPL	Total		41	27	—		—		—		41	27
Melbourne City	2020–21	A-League	1	0	—		—		—		1	0
Melbourne City	2021–22	A-League Men	1	0	0	0	0	0	—		1	0
Melbourne City	2022–23	A-League Men	4	1	1	0	—		—		5	1
Melbourne City	2023–24	A-League Men	21	1	3	0	2	1	—		26	2
Melbourne City	2024–25	A-League Men	0	0	1	1	—		—		1	1
Melbourne City	Total		27	2	5	1	2	1	—		34	4
Career total			68	29	5	1	2	1	0	0	75	31

== Honours ==
Melbourne City

- A-League Men Premiership: 2022–23
- A-League Championship : 2024–25
