= Zane Schreiber =

Australian soccer player

Personal information
- Full name: Zane William Schreiber
- Date of birth: 31 May 2005 (age 21)
- Height: 1.76 m (5 ft 9 in)
- Position: Midfielder

Team information
- Current team: Newcastle Jets
- Number: 6

Youth career
- –2017: SD Raiders
- 2018–2021: Blacktown City FC
- 2022–2023: Sydney FC

Senior career*
Years	Team	Apps	(Gls)
2022–2023	Sydney FC Youth	19	(0)
2023–2026	Melbourne City FC	47	(1)
2024–2026	Melbourne City FC Youth	11	(0)
2026–	Newcastle Jets FC	0	(0)
- * Club domestic league appearances and goals

Zane Schreiber (born 31 May 2005) is an Australian professional soccer player who plays as a Midfielder for the Newcastle Jets.

== Youth Career ==
Zane came through the NPL youth systems of both SD Raiders and Blacktown City, before signing for the academy of A-League side Sydney FC.

Zane featured 19 times across a season and a half with the Sydney FC Youth team, before signing a three-year deal with Melbourne City FC.

== Club career ==
=== Melbourne City FC ===
==== 2023-24 Season ====
Zane make his Melbourne City debut in the 2023 Australia Cup, coming off of the bench in a 3-0 win over Wellington Phoenix. Zane missed large portions of his debut season due to injury, restricting him to just 8 appearance across all competitions.

==== 2024-25 Season ====
Zane scored his first Melbourne City goal in the 2024 Australia Cup against Perth Glory. Across the season, Zane started 10 league matches, coming off of the bench in 12 more as city defeated Melbourne Victory 1-0 in the 2025 A-League Men Grand Final.

==== 2025-26 Season ====
Schreiber started in City's first match of the season, a 2-0 defeat to APIA Leichhardt in the Australia Cup. Zane took on a more active role within the City squad, starting 13 league games and appearing off of the bench in 10 more. He also played in 7 of Melbourne City's 10 AFC Champions League Elite fixtures. Zane scored his second goal for Melbourne City in a 4-0 win over Perth Glory in the A-League. At the end of the season, Melbourne City announced that Zane Schreiber would depart the club at the conclusion of his contract.

=== Newcastle Jets ===
The Newcastle Jets announced the signing of Zane Schreiber on the 12th of June 2026. He made his debut off the bench in a 3-2 loss to Preston Lions in the Australia Cup.

== Career statistics ==
As of match played 22 June 2026

Appearances and goals by club, season and competition
Club	Season	League			Cup		Continental		Total	
Club	Season	Division	Apps	Goals	Apps	Goals	Apps	Goals	Apps	Goals
Sydney FC Youth	2022	NPL NSW	6	0	—		—		6	0
Sydney FC Youth	2023	NPL NSW	13	0	—		—		13	0
Sydney FC Youth	Total		19	0	—		—		19	0
Melbourne City FC	2023–24	A-League	6	0	2	0	0	0	8	0
Melbourne City FC	2024–25	A-League	22	0	1	1	—		23	1
Melbourne City FC	2025–26	A-League	23	1	1	0	7	0	31	1
Melbourne City FC	Total		51	1	4	1	7	0	62	2
Melbourne City FC Youth	2024	VPL1	7	0	—		—		7	0
Melbourne City FC Youth	2025	VPL1	3	0	—		—		3	0
Melbourne City FC Youth	2026	NPL VIC	1	0	—		—		1	0
Melbourne City FC Youth	Total		11	0	—		—		11	0
Newcastle Jets FC	2026–27	A-League	0	0	1	0	0	0	1	0
Career Total			81	1	5	1	7	0	93	2

== Honours ==
=== Team ===
==== Melbourne City FC ====
- 2024–25 A-League Championship
