= Liam Bonetig =

Australian soccer player (born 2005)

Personal information
- Full name: Liam Robert Oska Bonetig
- Date of birth: August 20, 2005 (age 21)
- Place of birth: Shellharbour, New South Wales, Australia
- Height: 1.93 m (6 ft 4 in)
- Position: Central defender

Team information
- Current team: Melbourne City
- Number: 4

Youth career
- 2016–2023: Western Sydney Wanderers
- 2023–2025: Celtic

Senior career*
Years	Team	Apps	(Gls)
2025–	Melbourne City	16	(0)

International career^{‡}
2023–2025	Australia U20	8	(0)
2026–	Australia U23	1	(0)
- * Club domestic league appearances and goals as of 28 February 2026 ‡ National team caps and goals as of 27 October 2025

Liam Robert Oska Bonetig (born 20 August 2005) is an Australian professional soccer player who plays as a central defender for Melbourne City in the A-League Men.

== Early life and youth career ==
Bonetig was born in Shellharbour, New South Wales, and began playing football in the Illawarra region. He joined the Western Sydney Wanderers academy in 2016, progressing through the club’s youth ranks. Standing at 1.93 metres, he is noted for his height and aerial presence as a central defender.

== Club career ==
=== Celtic ===
In September 2023, Bonetig moved abroad to join Scottish club Celtic F.C. on a three-year deal. He featured regularly for the club’s B-team in the Lowland Football League and the UEFA Youth League, gaining experience in a European environment.

=== Melbourne City ===
On 11 July 2025, Bonetig returned to Australia, signing a three-year contract with Melbourne City FC in the A-League Men. His signing was described by the club as an investment in long-term defensive talent, citing his development in Scotland as a key factor.

== International career ==
Bonetig has represented Australia at youth level, including appearances for the under-20 national team.

== Style of play ==
Bonetig is known for his aerial dominance, composure in possession, and ability to build play from the back—traits often highlighted by his coaches at both Celtic and Melbourne City.

== Personal life ==
He is the younger brother of fellow professional footballer Alex Bonetig, who also plays in MLS for Portland Timbers.
