= Samuel Souprayen =

French footballer (born 1989)

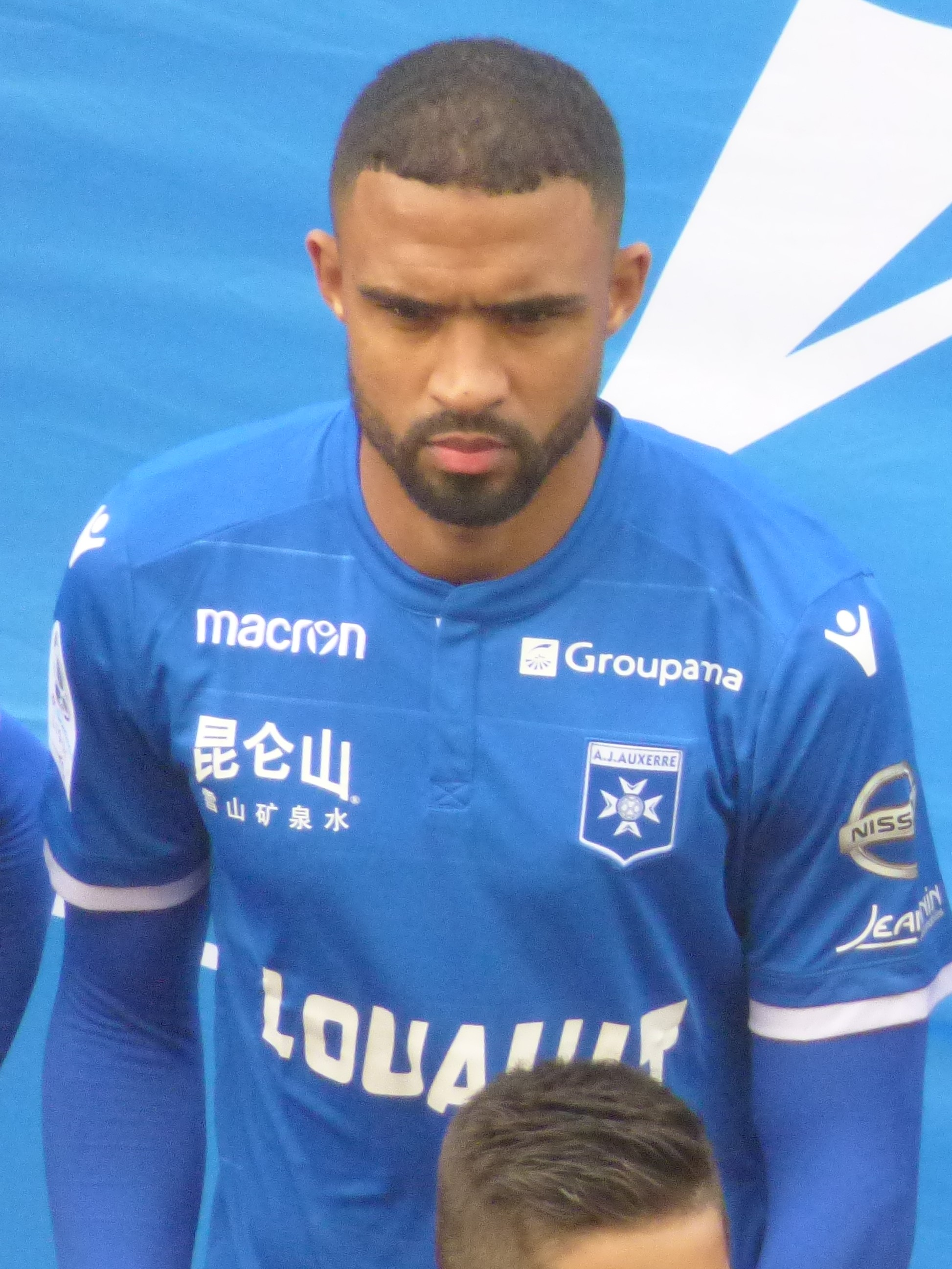
- Souprayen with Auxerre in 2019

Personal information
- Date of birth: 18 February 1989 (age 37)
- Place of birth: Saint-Benoît, Réunion
- Height: 1.87 m (6 ft 2 in)

Youth career
- 1998–2002: CASCOL Oullins
- 2002–2008: Rennes

Senior career*
Years	Team	Apps	(Gls)
2008–2011	Rennes	24	(0)
2009–2010	→ Dijon (loan)	31	(0)
2010–2011	Rennes B	7	(1)
2011–2015	Dijon	124	(2)
2013	Dijon B	1	(0)
2015–2018	Verona	83	(0)
2018–2021	Auxerre	50	(0)
2021–2023	Botev Plovdiv	57	(1)
2023–2026	Melbourne City	58	(3)

International career
2006–2007	France U18	6	(0)
2007–2008	France U19	10	(0)
2009	France U20	2	(0)
2009–2010	France U21	2	(0)
- * Club domestic league appearances and goals as of 5 April 2025

Samuel Souprayen (French: [sa.my.ɛl su.pʁa.jɛn], Malagasy: [supɾaˈjɛn samuˈɛl]; born 18 February 1989) is a French professional footballer who most recently played for A-League club Melbourne City. He plays as a centre back capable of playing on the left side of defense, as well. He is a former France youth international having earned caps with the under-18, under-19, under-20, and under-21 teams. Souprayen played with the under-20 team at the 2009 Mediterranean Games.

== Club career ==
Souprayen was born in Saint-Benoît, Réunion, but grew in the city of Lyon in the Rhône-Alpes region. He began his football career with CASCOL Oullins in the commune of Oullins. He later joined the youth academy of Stade Rennais. At Rennes, he was captain of both the youth sides that won the under-18 championship for the 2006–07 season, and the Coupe Gambardella in 2008. On 17 July 2008, he signed his first professional contract agreeing to a three-year deal through 2011. He was officially promoted to the senior team for the 2008–09 season and was assigned the number 4 shirt by manager Guy Lacombe.

Though on the first team, Souprayen only saw playing time with the club's Championnat de France amateur team appearing in 31 matches, starting 30 of them, helping the side finish 1st among professional clubs in their group, thus qualifying for the playoffs, where they lost to Lyon in the semi-finals. After playing with the reserves for the first four matches of the 2009–10 season, Rennes decided it would be best to send the player on loan to Ligue 2 club Dijon FCO for the entire season. At Dijon, Souprayen was assigned the number 19 shirt and made his professional debut on 11 September in the club's 1–0 win over Bastia playing the entire 90 minutes.

Following the season, on 15 May, Rennes manager Frédéric Antonetti confirmed that Souprayen would return to the team and that he would be heavily relied upon for the 2010–11 season. On 21 July, Rennes rewarded the player with a two-year contract extension tying him to the club until 2013. After featuring in only 16 league matches in the 2010–11 season, in June 2011, Souprayen signed a four-year contract with newly promoted first division club Dijon. The defender had previously spent the 2009–10 season on loan at the club.

On 17 August 2018, Souprayen signed with French club Auxerre.

On 23 July 2021, Souprayen signed a two-year contract as a free agent with Bulgarian First League club Botev Plovdiv.

== International career ==
Born in Réunion, Souprayen is of Malagasy descent. Souprayen has played with both the under-18 team and the under-19 team playing with the squad that fail to qualify for the 2008 UEFA European Under-19 Football Championship. On 26 May 2009, he was named to the under-20 squad to play in the 2009 Mediterranean Games. He participated in two of the team's four matches as France finished in 4th-place position.

== Career statistics ==
=== Career ===
As of match played 5 April 2025

Appearances and goals by club, season and competition
Club	Season	League			Cup		League cup		Continental		Other		Total	
Club	Season	Division	Apps	Goals	Apps	Goals	Apps	Goals	Apps	Goals	Apps	Goals	Apps	Goals
Rennes	2008–09	Ligue 1	0	0	—		—		—		—		0	0
Rennes	2010–11	Ligue 1	16	0	3	0	1	0	—		—		20	0
Rennes	Total		16	0	3	0	1	0	—		—		20	0
Dijon (loan)	2009–10	Ligue 2	31	0	—		—		—		—		31	0
Rennes B	2010–11	Championnat National 2	7	1	—		—		—		—		7	1
Dijon	2011–12	Ligue 1	34	0	2	0	2	0	—		—		38	0
Dijon	2012–13	Ligue 2	27	0	—		1	0	—		—		28	0
Dijon	2013–14	Ligue 2	33	1	2	0	1	0	—		—		36	1
Dijon	2014–15	Ligue 2	30	1	2	0	2	0	—		—		34	1
Dijon	Total		124	2	6	0	6	0	—		—		136	2
Dijon B	2012–13	Championnat National 3	1	0	—		—		—		—		1	0
Verona	2015–16	Serie A	20	0	2	0	—		—		—		22	0
Verona	2016–17	Serie B	41	0	1	0	—		—		—		42	0
Verona	2017–18	Serie A	22	0	3	0	—		—		—		25	0
Verona	2018–19	Serie B	—		1	0	—		—		—		1	0
Verona	Total		83	0	7	0	—		—		—		90	0
Auxerre	2018–19	Ligue 2	29	0	0	0	1	1	—		—		30	1
Auxerre	2019–20	Ligue 2	20	0	2	0	1	0	—		—		23	0
Auxerre	2020–21	Ligue 2	0	0	2	0	—		—		—		2	0
Auxerre	Total		49	0	4	0	2	1	—		—		53	1
Botev Plovdiv	2021–22	First Professional Football League	29	1	—		—		—		—		29	1
Botev Plovdiv	2022–23	First Professional Football League	28	0	1	0	—		2 (Note: Appearance(s) in UEFA Europa Conference League)	0	—		31	0
Botev Plovdiv	Total		57	1	1	0	—		2	0	—		60	1
Melbourne City	2023–24	A-League	21	2	3	0	—		5 (Note: Appearance(s) in AFC Champions League)	0	—		29	2
Melbourne City	2024–25	A-League	21	1	1	0	—		—		—		22	1
Melbourne City	Total		42	3	4	0	—		5	1	—		51	3
Career Total			410	7	25	0	9	1	7	0	0	0	451	8
