= Beckham Baker =

Australian soccer player (born 2008)

Personal information
- Full name: Beckham Nicolez Soares Baker
- Date of birth: 8 August 2008 (age 18)
- Place of birth: Melbourne, Australia
- Height: 1.75 m (5 ft 9 in)
- Positions: Midfielder; winger

Team information
- Current team: Melbourne City
- Number: 38

Youth career
- Melbourne City

Senior career*
Years	Team	Apps	(Gls)
2025–	Melbourne City	7	(0)
- * Club domestic league appearances and goals as of 25 November 2025

Beckham Nicolez Soares Baker (born 8 August 2008) is an Australian professional soccer player who plays as a midfielder or winger for Melbourne City.

== Early life ==
Baker was born on 8 August 2008 to a Timorese mother of Cape Verdean descent and an Australian father. While born in Australia, and a native of Melbourne, he also grew up in Karratha, Western Australia.

Baker attended Rowville Secondary College as part of the Rowville Sports Academy, Football program.

== Career ==
As a youth player, Baker joined the youth academy of Melbourne City. Baker also spent time in the United Kingdom, playing in the youth teams of English powerhouses Manchester City, Chelsea FC, and Manchester United. Moreover, Baker moved to Spain in 2022 after joining the academy of Spanish club Villarreal CF before returning to Melbourne and rejoining the City academy. Ahead of the 2025–26 season, he was promoted to the club's senior team.

== Style of play ==
Baker plays as a midfielder or winger. Cape Verdean news website Criolosports.com wrote in 2025 that he "distinguished himself with his speed, dribbling ability, and creativity".
