= Ben Abraham (referee) =

Australian soccer referee

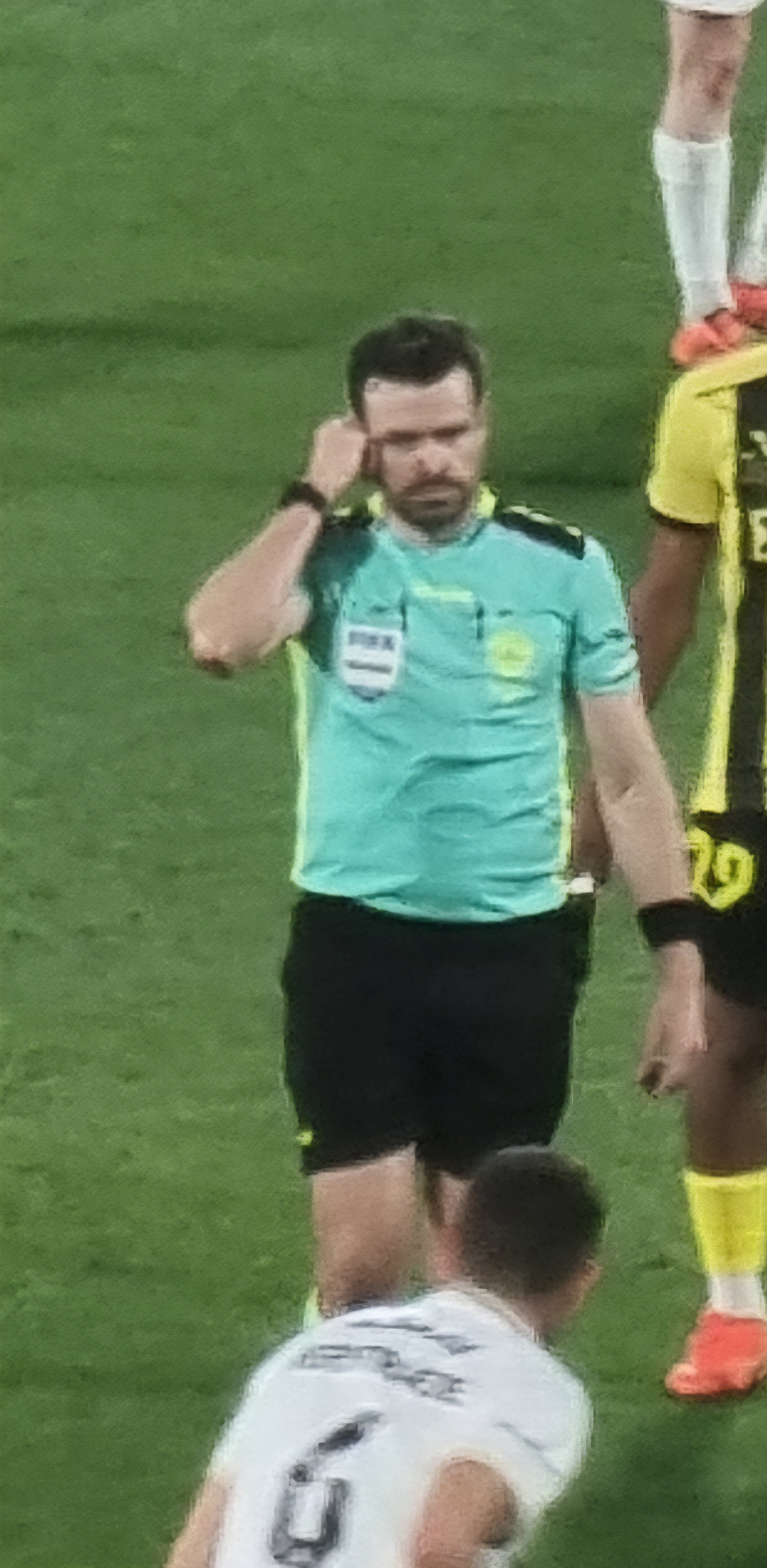
- Ben Abraham refereeing the New Zealand derby on 8 November 2025
- Full name: Benjamin Abraham
- Born: New South Wales, Australia

Domestic
Years	League	Role
2017–	A-League Men	Fourth official
2017–	Australia Cup	Referee
2019–	A-League Men	Referee
2020–	NPL NSW	Referee

Benjamin Abraham is an Australian soccer referee. He was the referee for the 2023 Australia Cup final and has been officiating in the A-League Men since 2019.

== Career ==
Hailing from New South Wales, Abraham initially served as a fourth official in A-League Men and as a referee for FFA Cup matches in 2017. He joined the A-League referees panel in August 2019 for the first time, and refereed his first professional match between Melbourne City and Wellington Phoenix on 3 November 2019. Abraham was openly criticised by Louis Fenton and Phoenix coach Ufuk Talay for a controversial penalty call that gave City a 3–1 lead. The match ended in a 3–2 victory for Melbourne City.

Abraham was appointed referee for the 2023 Australia Cup final between Sydney FC and Brisbane Roar. It would be his first and final time officiating an Australia Cup final.

== Major matches refereed ==
Date	Match	Tournament	Venue	Ref.
7 October 2023	Sydney FC vs Brisbane Roar (3–1)	2023 Australia Cup final	Sydney Football Stadium	
