= Lawrence Wong (soccer) =

Australian soccer player (born 2007)

Personal information
- Date of birth: 6 October 2007 (age 19)
- Place of birth: Melbourne, Victoria, Australia
- Height: 1.80 m (5 ft 11 in)
- Position: Attacking midfielder

Team information
- Current team: Melbourne City
- Number: 41

Youth career
- –2024: Melbourne City

Senior career*
Years	Team	Apps	(Gls)
2024–	Melbourne City NPL	11	(3)
2025–	Melbourne City	23	(1)

International career^{‡}
2025–	Australia U18	0	(0)
- * Club domestic league appearances and goals as of 28 March 2026 ‡ National team caps and goals as of 1 June 2025

Lawrence Wong (Chinese: [wɔːŋ]; born 6 October 2007) is an Australian soccer player who plays as an attacking midfielder for Melbourne City.

== Career ==
At the age of eleven, Wong joined the youth academy of Melbourne City and was promoted to the club's senior team in 2025. On 18 January 2025, he debuted for them during a 0–3 away loss to Auckland FC in the league, becoming the first debutant to graduate from their Player Development Pathway. On 15 February 2025, he scored his first goal for them during a 1–0 home win over Perth Glory FC in the league, becoming the youngest goalscorer in their history at the age of 17 and 132 days.

=== Youth international ===
He was called up in May 2025 for the Australia men's national under-18 soccer team, to take part in the 2025 UEFA Friendship Cup commencing in early June.
