= Melbourne City FC Youth =

Melbourne City Youth
- Full name: Melbourne City Football Club Youth
- Nickname: City Youth
- Founded: 2011; 15 years ago
- Ground: City Football Academy
- Owner: City Football Group
- Chairman: Khaldoon Al Mubarak
- Youth Head Coach: Stuart McDonald
- League: NPL Victoria; A-League Youth
- 2026: 10th of 14
- Website: www.melbournecityfc.com.au
Home colours	Away colours

Melbourne City Football Club Youth is the youth system of Melbourne City Football Club based in Cranbourne East, Melbourne. The youth teams consist of an under-23s team that competes in senior levels of soccer in Victoria; currently the Victorian Premier League 1, and a development squad of an under-21s team that competes in the under-23 levels of soccer in Victoria.

Melbourne City Academy was introduced in 2016 and are composed of four academy teams, ranking from under-14s to under-17s teams that compete in the youth National Premier Leagues Victoria leagues.

== History ==
=== Early years (2011–2014) ===
The team was founded in 2011 as Melbourne Heart Youth, the season after their senior side Melbourne City (then known as Melbourne Heart FC), made their A-League debut. The inaugural manager was John Aloisi before he accepted the role as head manager at the end of the 2011–12 season. From 2012 onwards, Joe Palatsides had been the manager. The youth team's first match was played in the 2011–12 against local rivals Melbourne Victory in a 2–0 win at John Cain Memorial Park.

=== Entry into National Premier Leagues (2014–2018) ===
On 7 November 2014, it was confirmed that Melbourne City would compete in the NPL Victoria 1 competition from the 2015 season onwards. The team consists mainly of Melbourne City's youth team, which also competes in the A-League Youth. On top of this, Melbourne City opted to send a U-20 team to enter the concurrently-run development-level U-20 NPL league competition.

The team finished on top of the table of the 2014–15 National Youth League, tied with Brisbane Roar FC Youth on both points and goal difference but were awarded the title having scored a greater number of goals.

After several seasons competing in the NPL, Melbourne City announced they were expanding their participation to also enter teams into the U-18 and U-15 competitions. In February 2018, youth teams joined the National Premier Leagues for the under-20s and under-18s sides, with the U-18 side being managed by Davey van 't Schip (the brother of former manager John van 't Schip).

== Stadium ==
The team hosts its home matches at CB Smith Reserve and Casey Fields. In previous years, home games have also been played at Epping Stadium, John Cain Memorial Park, John Ilhan Memorial Reserve and La Trobe University.

== Players ==
These players can also play with the senior squad and compete in the A-League Youth and the VPL 1.

As of 16 February 2026

Note: Flags indicate national team as defined under FIFA eligibility rules; some limited exceptions apply. Players may hold more than one non-FIFA nationality.

No.	Pos.	Nation	Player
—	GK	AUS	Jonty Benfield
—	GK	AUS	Lachlan Charles
—	GK	AUS	Sam Robson
—	DF	AUS	Peter Antoniou
—	DF	IDN	Mathew Baker
—	DF	AUS	Ryan Kalms
—	DF	AUS	Besian Kutleshi
—	DF	AUS	Jayden Necovski
—	DF	AUS	Yaser Payendeh
—	MF	AUS	Beckham Baker
—	MF	AUS	Nikola Djurovic
—	MF	AUS	Angus Mackintosh

No.	Pos.	Nation	Player
—	MF	AUS	Oliver O’Carroll
—	MF	AUS	Julian Recchia
—	MF	AUS	Lawrence Wong
—	FW	AUS	Roland Ballah
—	FW	AUS	Luke Becvinovski
—	FW	AUS	Isiah Boston
—	FW	NZL	Aaron Cartwright
—	FW	AUS	Akeem Gerald
—	FW	AUS	Daniel Matina
—	FW	AUS	Tobias Servin

== Current staff ==
Stuart McDonald	Youth Head Coach
James Jeggo	Youth Assistant Coach

== Honours ==
- A-League Youth Premiership
  - Winners (2): 2016–17, 2017–18
  - Runners-up (1): 2018–19
- A-League Youth Championship
  - Winners (2): 2014–15, 2017
  - Runners-up (1): 2018
- Victoria Premier League 2
  - Runners-up (1): 2022

== Team records ==
=== A-League Youth ===
Season	A-League Youth									Grand Final	Top scorer	
Season	Pld	W	D	L	GF	GA	GD	Pts	Position	Grand Final	Player(s)	Goals
League format
2011–12	18	8	2	8	35	37	−2	26	5th	–	Zac Walker	7
2012–13	18	8	1	9	32	34	−2	25	6th	–	Joshua Groenewald	8
2013–14	18	8	4	6	40	30	+10	28	5th	–	Marcus Schroen	5
2014–15	18	10	5	3	40	27	+13	35	1st	–	Wade Dekker	9
Conference format
2015–16	8	3	1	4	18	23	−5	10	3rd	Did not qualify	Wade Dekker; Chris Cristaldo	4
2016–17	8	5	1	2	18	12	+6	16	1st	Champions	Yusuf Ahmed	5

=== Football Victoria ===
Season	Football Victoria											Top scorer	
Season	T	League	Pld	W	D	L	GF	GA	GD	Pts	Position	Player(s)	Goals
2015	3	NPL Victoria 2 West	28	13	5	10	56	45	+11	44	5th	Wade Dekker	10
2016	3	NPL Victoria 2 West	28	14	4	10	70	45	+25	46	3rd	Chris Cristaldo	10
2017	3	NPL Victoria 2 East	28	11	8	9	68	49	+19	41	3rd	Austin Wong	9
2018	3	NPL Victoria 2 East	28	10	4	14	60	59	+1	34	6th	Moudi Najjar	14
2019	3	NPL Victoria 2 East	28	9	5	14	60	58	+2	32	7th ↓	Ramy Najjarine	13
2020	4	NPL Victoria 3	No matches played due to COVID-19 pandemic.										
2021	4	NPL Victoria 3	14	8	1	5	37	19	+18	25	5th (Note: Season suspended after 14 matches due to COVID-19 pandemic.)	Max Caputo	12
2022	4	NPL Victoria 3	22	15	4	3	43	13	+30	52	2nd ↑	Arion Sulemani	12
2023	3	NPL Victoria 2	26	11	3	12	54	56	−2	36	9th	Raphael Borges Rodrigues	7
2024	3	VPL 1	26	11	8	7	55	41	+14	41	5th	Medin Memeti	9
2025	3	VPL 1	26	16	6	4	66	28	+38	54	3rd ↑	Arion Sulemani	9
2026	2	NPL Victoria	0	0	0	0	0	0	0	0			

== See also ==
- Melbourne City FC
- Melbourne City FC (A-League Women)
