= 2023–24 Melbourne City FC season =

14th season in existence of Melbourne City FC

Melbourne City
2023–24 season
- Owner: City Football Group
- Chairman: Khaldoon Al Mubarak
- Manager: Rado Vidošić (until 1 November 2023); Aurelio Vidmar (from 1 November 2023)
- Stadium: AAMI Park
- A-League Men: 6th
- A-League Men Finals: Elimination final
- Australia Cup: Semi-finals
- AFC Champions League: Group stage
- Top goalscorer: League: Tolgay Arslan (13); All: Tolgay Arslan (19)
- Highest home attendance: 25,884 vs. Melbourne Victory (23 December 2023); A-League Men
- Lowest home attendance: 1,153 vs. Wellington Phoenix (27 August 2023); Australia Cup
- Average home league attendance: 8,488
- Biggest win: 8–0 vs. Perth Glory (H) (14 April 2024); A-League Men
- Biggest defeat: 0–6 vs. Adelaide United (A) (29 October 2022); A-League Men
Home colours	Away colours	Third colours
- All statistics correct as of 6 May 2024.

The 2023–24 season is the 14th in the history of Melbourne City Football Club, and the 10th since the club was taken over by the City Football Group. In addition to the A-League Men, Melbourne City participated in the Australia Cup for the ninth time, and is participating in the AFC Champions League for the second time. They are managed by Aurelio Vidmar after the club and Rado Vidošić mutually terminated his contract after 2 league matches.

== Review ==
=== Background ===
Melbourne City won three consecutive A-League Men premierships; the first ever A-League Men club to do so and played their fourth consecutive Grand Final in the 2022–23 season. Rado Vidošić became new head coach during the 2022 FIFA World Cup mid-season break in place of Patrick Kisnorbo leaving for French club Troyes. City lost the Grand Final 1–6 to the Central Coast Mariners; three of four recent Grand Final lost; twice in neutral CommBank Stadium, as the 2023 Grand Final was played after an APL decision of moving A-Leagues Grand Finals to Sydney for the next three seasons earlier in the season.

=== Pre-season ===
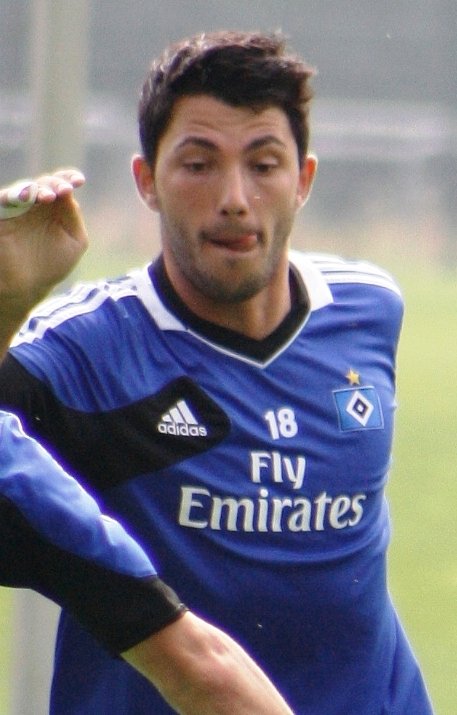
Tolgay Arslan with Hamburger SV in 2013

Valon Berisha, Matt Sutton, Raphael Borges Rodrigues and Kerrin Stokes all departed City following conclusions to their playing contracts on 9 June 2023. A further two departures were made the same day of Tom Glover and Aiden O'Neill in search of footballing opportunities in Europe. City's first signing of the 2023–24 season was German midfieilder Tolgay Arslan coming off Serie A club Udinese for two seasons on 15 June 2023. Two academy players Arion Sulemani and Emin Durakovic both signed three-year scholarship contracts for City a week later. Only a day later, three young players signed for City; Patrick Beach, Alessandro Lopane and Zane Schreiber all on multi-year deals. City were drawn to play NPL Victoria side Oakleigh Cannons in the 2023 Australia Cup Round of 32. On 30 June 2023, rumoured Steven Ugarkovic joined City for until the end of the 2024–25 season and Marco Tilio departed City for Scottish club Celtic.

Experienced A-League Men goalkeeper Jamie Young signed for City on 4 July 2023. The Round of 32 clash in the Australia Cup details were confirmed to play on 13 August 2023 at Jack Edwards Reserve; home of Oakleigh Cannons. On 6 July 2023, Terry Antonis joined City for the 2023–24 season. Four days later, City made their second international signing French defender Samuel Souprayen for a two-year deal. Max Caputo extended his contract on 13 July 2023 to last until the end of the 2025–26 season. Official start dates for the A-Leagues seasons were confirmed, with the A-League Men to begin between 20 and 22 October 2023. City's first friendly of the season was confirmed to play Dandenong Thunder at George Andrews Reserve.

Croatian winger Marin Jakoliš signed for City on loan from Ligue 2 club Angers SCO on 2 August 2023. Four days later, former player Aziz Behich returned to City on a two-year deal. Jordon Hall re-signed for City for an extra season, and Frenchman Florin Berenguer departing City after five seasons, 111 appearances and four silverware on 9 August 2023. The friendly against Dandenong Thunder resulted in a 3–1 win via goals by Arslan and two for Antonis.

=== August ===

Starting line-up for the 2023 Australia Cup Round of 32 match against Oakleigh Cannons on 13 August

City kicked off their season in the Australia Cup Round of 32 against Oakleigh Cannons on 13 August 2023. Despite going behind twice, City claimed the win thanks to two penalty goals by Arslan and a late winner by Lopane sending them through to the Round of 16. It was confirmed for the third consecutive time, that City would host Wellington Phoenix in the Round of 16. On 17 August 2023, Callum Talbot was called up to the Olyroos squad for the 2024 AFC U-23 Asian Cup qualification and Moroccan attacking midfielder Hamza Sakhi signed for City on loan for the season off Ligue 2 club Auxerre. Australia Cup Round of 16 details were confirmed to play host back at Jack Edwards Reserve against the Wellington Phoenix.

Full A-Leagues fixtures were released on 24 August 2023, with City confirmed to play the opener to locals Western United and play host to two Melbourne Derbies. The same day had City's AFC Champions League group stage opponents against Thai club Buriram United, Japanese club Ventforet Kofu and Chinese club Zhejiang. City in their Round of 16 clash on 27 August 2023, backed a revenge win after two bowouts in previous Australia Cups against Wellington Phoenix with a 3–0 win via two goals by Maclaren and the opener by Arslan; with two season debutants of Sakhi and returning Behich.

=== September ===
Two call-ups to the Socceroos squad in the September were made of Leckie and Behich on 1 September 2023 and Jamie Maclaren was confirmed City captain ahead of the 2023–24 season. City's quarter-final Australia Cup match up was confirmed against South Australian side North Eastern MetroStars at T.K. Shutter Reserve. On 8 September 2023, Leckie was confirmed a knee injury and therefore missing out on Socceroos match against Mexico. Only a week later, Nabbout suffered an achilles injury in a behind-closed-friendly ruling him out for the 2023–24 season immediately implementing an injury loan replacement of Brazilian winger Léo Natel. City continued to progress through the Australia Cup, by winning their quarter-final match 2–1 against North Eastern MetroStars in a late comeback on 15 September 2023 via a header goal by Good and last minute winner by Arslan; his fourth of the season.

City were set to host their Australia Cup semi-final at AAMI Park against Sydney FC. In the mid-week, they began their AFC Champions League group stage campaign in their first at home in a 0–0 draw with Ventforet Kofu on 20 September 2023. With only four days time until City's semi-final clash with Sydney, it resulted in a 2–1 loss as City's first loss of the season and ending their Australia Cup run one short of the final. On 25 September 2023, four players; Sebastian Esposito, Max Caputo, Zane Schreiber and Harrison Shillington were called up to the Young Socceroos' squad for the October window and Harry Politdis signed a senior deal for the 2023–24 season.

== First-team squad ==
Note: Flags indicate national team as defined under FIFA eligibility rules; some limited exceptions apply. Players may hold more than one non-FIFA nationality.

No.	Pos.	Nation	Player
1	GK	ENG	Jamie Young
2	DF	AUS	Scott Galloway
4	DF	POR	Nuno Reis
6	MF	AUS	Steven Ugarkovic
7	FW	AUS	Mathew Leckie
8	MF	AUS	Jimmy Jeggo
9	FW	AUS	Jamie Maclaren (captain)
10	MF	GER	Tolgay Arslan
11	FW	BRA	Léo Natel (on loan from Corinthians)
14	DF	CHI	Vicente Fernández
15	FW	AUS	Andrew Nabbout
17	MF	AUS	Terry Antonis
18	DF	AUS	Jordon Hall
21	MF	AUS	Alessandro Lopane

No.	Pos.	Nation	Player
22	DF	AUS	Curtis Good
23	FW	AUS	Marco Tilio (on loan from Celtic)
25	DF	AUS	Callum Talbot
26	DF	FRA	Samuel Souprayen
33	GK	AUS	Patrick Beach
34	FW	AUS	Arion Sulemani
35	MF	AUS	Zane Schreiber
37	FW	AUS	Max Caputo
38	DF	AUS	Harry Politidis
39	MF	AUS	Emin Durakovic
40	GK	AUS	James Nieuwenhuizen (Scholarship)
44	FW	CRO	Marin Jakoliš (on loan from Angers)
46	FW	AUS	Benjamin Mazzeo
—	DF	AUS	Jayden Necovski (Scholarship)

== Transfers ==
=== Transfers in ===
No.	Position	Player	Transferred from	Type/fee	Contract length	Date	Ref.
33	GK	Patrick Beach	Central Coast Mariners Academy	Free transfer	3 years	14 June 2023	
10	MF	(Germany) Tolgay Arslan	(Italy) Udinese	Free transfer	2 years	15 June 2023	
21	MF	Alessandro Lopane	Unattached	Free transfer	2 years (Note: Option for an additional year.)	23 June 2023	
35	MF	Zane Schreiber	Sydney FC NPL	Free transfer	3 years	23 June 2023	
6	MF	Steven Ugarkovic	Unattached	Free transfer	2 years	30 June 2023	
1	GK	(England) Jamie Young	Unattached	Free transfer	1 year	4 July 2023	
17	MF	Terry Antonis	Unattached	Free transfer	1 year	6 July 2023	
26	DF	(France) Samuel Souprayen	Unattached	Free transfer	2 years	10 July 2023	
44	FW	(Croatia) Marin Jakoliš	(France) Angers	Loan	1 year	2 August 2023	
16	DF	Aziz Behich	(Scotland) Dundee United	Undisclosed	2 years	6 August 2023	
8	MF	(Morocco) Hamza Sakhi	(France) Auxerre	Loan	1 year	17 August 2023	
11	FW	(Brazil) Léo Natel	(Brazil) Corinthians	Loan	1 year	15 September 2023	
8	MF	Jimmy Jeggo	(Scotland) Hibernian	Undisclosed	1.5 years	31 January 2024	
23	FW	Marco Tilio	(Scotland) Celtic	Loan	5 months	1 February 2024	
14	DF	(Chile) Vicente Fernández	Unattached	Free transfer	5 months	8 February 2024	

==== From youth squad ====
No.	Position	Player	Age	Date	Notes	Ref.
38	DF	Harry Politidis	21	25 September 2023	1 year contract	
46	FW	Benjamin Mazzeo	18	16 January 2024	2.5 year contract	
	DF	Jayden Necovski	16	24 April 2024	3 year scholarship contract	

=== Transfers out ===
No.	Position	Player	Transferred to	Type/fee	Date	Ref.
38	DF	Jordan Bos	(Belgium) Westerlo	$2,000,000	16 May 2023	
3	DF	Scott Jamieson	Retired		4 June 2023	
14	MF	(Kosovo) Valon Berisha	(France) Reims	End of loan	9 June 2023	
33	GK	Matt Sutton	Unattached	End of contract	9 June 2023	
35	FW	Raphael Borges Rodrigues	Unattached	End of contract	9 June 2023	
36	DF	Kerrin Stokes	Unattached	End of contract	9 June 2023	
1	GK	Tom Glover	Unattached	End of contract	9 June 2023	
13	MF	Aiden O'Neill	Unattached	End of contract	9 June 2023	
6	DF	(Finland) Thomas Lam	Unattached	Mutual contract termination	13 June 2023	
8	MF	(Netherlands) Richard van der Venne	Unattached	Mutual contract termination	13 June 2023	
23	FW	Marco Tilio	(Scotland) Celtic	Undisclosed	30 June 2023	
30	MF	Luke Oresti	Central Coast Mariners Academy	Mutual contract termination	8 July 2023	
10	MF	(France) Florin Berenguer	Unattached	End of contract	9 August 2023	
8	MF	(Morocco) Hamza Sakhi	(France) Ajaccio	Mutual contract termination	24 January 2024	
16	DF	Aziz Behich	(Saudi Arabia) Al Nassr	Loan/$2,000,000	30 January 2024	

=== Contract extensions ===
No.	Player	Position	Duration	Date	Notes
34	Arion Sulemani	FW	3 years	22 June 2023	New 3-year contract replacing previous scholarship contract which was set to expire in 2024.
39	Emin Durakovic	MF	3 years	22 June 2023	New 3-year contract replacing previous scholarship contract which was set to expire in 2024.
37	Max Caputo	FW	3 years	13 July 2023	
18	Jordon Hall	DF	1 year	9 August 2023	
40	James Nieuwenhuizen	GK	3 years	17 October 2023	New 3-year contract signed, starting at the end of his scholarship contract which is set to expire at the end of 2023–24.
8	(Morocco) Hamza Sakhi	MF	1 year	11 January 2024	Signed a permanent contract until end of 2024–25.

== Pre-season and friendlies ==
Win Draw Loss

2 August 2023	Western United (Australia)	3–1	(Australia) Melbourne City	Melbourne
12:30 AEST	Danzaki 13'; Bisetto 95'; Najdovski 104'	Report	Jakoliš 31'	Stadium: The Hangar; Attendance: 0 (behind closed doors)
Note: Match was played over three 45-minute periods

9 August 2023	Dandenong Thunder (Australia)	1–3	(Australia) Melbourne City	Melbourne
19:30 AEST	? 55'	Report	Arslan 22'; Antonis 28', 41'	Stadium: George Andrews Reserve

23 August 2023	Melbourne City (Australia)	1–0	(Australia) Western United	Melbourne
AEST	Caputo 56'	Report		Stadium: Casey Fields; Attendance: 0 (behind closed doors)

== Competitions ==
=== Overall record ===
Competition	First match	Last match	Starting round	Final position	Record							
Competition	First match	Last match	Starting round	Final position	Pld	W	D	L	GF	GA	GD	Win %
A-League Men	21 October 2023	28 April 2024	Matchday 1	6th	27	11	6	10	50	38	+12	40.74
A-League Men Finals	5 May 2024	5 May 2024	Elimination Final	Elimination Final	1	0	1	0	1	1	+0	0.00
Australia Cup	13 August 2023	24 September 2023	Round of 32	Semi-finals	4	3	0	1	9	5	+4	75.00
AFC Champions League	20 September 2023	12 December 2023	Group stage	Group stage	6	2	3	1	8	6	+2	33.33
Total					38	16	10	12	68	50	+18	42.11

Last updated: 5 May 2024
Source: Soccerway

=== A-League Men ===
==== League table ====
Pos	Team	Pld	W	D	L	GF	GA	GD	Pts	Qualification
4	Sydney FC	27	12	5	10	52	41	+11	41	Qualification for AFC Champions League Two and Finals series (Note: Qualified for AFC Champions League Two as the 2023 Australia Cup winners.)
5	Macarthur FC	27	11	8	8	45	48	−3	41	Qualification for Finals series (Note: The top two teams enter the finals series at the semi-finals, while the teams ranked third to sixth enter the finals series at the elimination-finals.)
6	Melbourne City	27	11	6	10	50	38	+12	39	Qualification for Finals series
7	Western Sydney Wanderers	27	11	4	12	44	48	−4	37	
8	Adelaide United	27	9	5	13	52	53	−1	32	

Source: A-Leagues
Rules for classification: 1) points; 2) wins; 3) goal difference; 4) goals scored; 5) head-to-head results; 5a) head-to-head points; 5b) head-to-head goal difference; 6) Fair Play points; 7) away goal difference; 8) away goals per match; 9) home goal difference; 10) home goals per match; 11) toss of a coin in an event of a tie of two clubs.

==== Results summary ====
Home figures include Melbourne City's 1–0 loss on neutral ground against Western Sydney Wanderers on 12 January 2024.

Overall								Home						Away					
Pld	W	D	L	GF	GA	GD	Pts	W	D	L	GF	GA	GD	W	D	L	GF	GA	GD
27	11	6	10	50	38	+12	39	7	5	2	35	10	+25	4	1	8	15	28	−13

Last updated: 27 April 2024.
Source: Ultimate A-League

==== Results by round ====
Round	1	2	3	4	5	6	7	8	9	10	11	27	13	14	15	16	17	18	19	20	12	22	21	23	24	25	26
Ground	H	A	H	H	A	A	A	H	H	H	A	N	A	H	A	A	H	A	A	H	A	H	A	H	H	A	H
Result	L	L	W	D	L	W	W	D	D	W	W	L	L	W	L	L	D	D	L	W	W	D	L	L	W	W	W
Position	10	12	8	9	9	7	7	6	7	4	4	6	8	6	6	7	7	7	8	7	6	7	7	7	7	6	6
Points	0	0	3	4	4	7	10	11	12	15	18	18	18	21	21	21	22	23	23	26	29	30	30	30	33	36	39

Updated to match(es) played on 28 April 2024. Source: Ultimate A-League
A = Away; H = Home; N = Neutral; W = Win; D = Draw; L = Loss

==== Matches ====
The league fixtures were announced on 24 August 2023.

21 October 2023 1	Melbourne City	1–2	Western United	Melbourne
17:30 AEDT	Arslan 62'	Report	Wales 60'; Botic 87' (pen.)	Stadium: AAMI Park; Attendance: 10,089; Referee: Jack Morgan

29 October 2023 2	Adelaide United	6–0	Melbourne City	Adelaide
18:30 ACDT	Irankunda 14'; Talbot 29' (o.g.); Tunnicliffe 75'; Toure 81'; Oliveira 88', 90+4'	Report		Stadium: Coopers Stadium; Attendance: 10,628; Referee: Shaun Evans

3 November 2023 3	Melbourne City	2–0	Sydney FC	Melbourne
19:45 AEDT	Ugarkovic 45'; Maclaren 46'	Report		Stadium: AAMI Park; Attendance: 5,303; Referee: Daniel Elder

12 November 2023 4	Melbourne City	3–3	Macarthur FC	Melbourne
15:00 AEDT	Maclaren 58', 90'; Antonis 90+3' (pen.)	Report	Dávila 61'; Hollman 83'; Millar 88'	Stadium: AAMI Park; Attendance: 5,712; Referee: Ben Abraham

25 November 2023 5	Wellington Phoenix	1–0	Melbourne City	Auckland
17:30 NZDT	Kraev 48'	Report		Stadium: Go Media Stadium; Attendance: 8,327; Referee: Lachlan Keevers

3 December 2023 6	Newcastle Jets	0–2	Melbourne City	Newcastle
17:00 AEDT		Report	Mazzeo 12'; Maclaren 58'	Stadium: McDonald Jones Stadium; Attendance: 5,636; Referee: Shane Skinner

8 December 2023 7	Perth Glory	1–2	Melbourne City	Perth
18:45 AWST	Taggart 45+1'	Report	Arslan 38' (pen.); Leckie 66'	Stadium: HBF Park; Attendance: 5,523; Referee: Daniel Cook

17 December 2023 8	Melbourne City	3–3	Central Coast Mariners	Melbourne
17:00 AEDT	Jakoliš 2'; Arslan 67'; Lopane 90+2'	Report	Torres 49', 60', 82'	Stadium: AAMI Park; Attendance: 5,906; Referee: Daniel Elder

23 December 2023 9	Melbourne City	0–0	Melbourne Victory	Melbourne
19:45 AEDT		Report		Stadium: AAMI Park; Attendance: 25,884; Referee: Alireza Faghani

28 December 2023 10	Melbourne City	8–1	Brisbane Roar	Melbourne
19:45 AEDT	Good 10'; Maclaren 14', 34', 58'; Natel 48', 70'; Arslan 76'; Mazzeo 85'	Report	Brownlie 62'	Stadium: AAMI Park; Attendance: 6,322; Referee: Alex King

7 January 2024 11	Western United	1–2	Melbourne City	Melbourne
17:00 AEDT	Ruhs 13'	Report	Sakhi 52'; Antonis 83'	Stadium: AAMI Park; Attendance: 6,265; Referee: Ben Abraham

12 January 2024 27	Melbourne City	0–1	Western Sydney Wanderers	Sydney
20:15 AEDT		Report	Pierias 27'	Stadium: CommBank Stadium; Attendance: 7,117; Referee: Jonathan Barreiro

21 January 2024 13	Central Coast Mariners	2–1	Melbourne City	Gosford
18:00 AEDT	Theoharous 50'; Torres 88'	Report	Ugarkovic 79'	Stadium: Industree Group Stadium; Attendance: 7,096; Referee: Adam Kersey

25 January 2024 14	Melbourne City	1–0	Adelaide United	Melbourne
19:45 AEDT	Antonis 5'	Report		Stadium: AAMI Park; Attendance: 6,092; Referee: Ben Abraham

2 February 2024 15	Perth Glory	4–2	Melbourne City	Perth
18:45 AWST	Amini 45+4' (pen.); Galloway 68' (o.g.); Taggart 70'; Anasmo 90+8'	Report	Arslan 21', 60'	Stadium: HBF Park; Attendance: 5,494; Referee: Shane Skinner

10 February 2024 16	Brisbane Roar	5–1	Melbourne City	Brisbane
17:00 AEST	Trewin 2'; Waddingham 30', 46'; O'Shea 33'; Jelacic 39'	Report	Antonis 73'	Stadium: Suncorp Stadium; Attendance: 7,288; Referee: Alex King

17 February 2024 17	Melbourne City	0–0	Melbourne Victory	Melbourne
19:45 AEDT		Report		Stadium: AAMI Park; Attendance: 20,877; Referee: Alireza Faghani

24 February 2024 18	Sydney FC	1–1	Melbourne City	Sydney
17:30 AEDT	Courtney-Perkins 29'	Report	Tilio 61'	Stadium: Allianz Stadium; Attendance: 15,120; Referee: Adam Kersey

1 March 2024 19	Macarthur FC	2–0	Melbourne City	Sydney
19:45 AEDT	Bernardo 47', 57'	Report		Stadium: Campbelltown Stadium; Attendance: 3,452; Referee: Adam Bavcar

9 March 2024 20	Melbourne City	1–0	Wellington Phoenix	Melbourne
19:00 AEDT	Souprayen 58'	Report		Stadium: AAMI Park; Attendance: 4,461; Referee: Alex King

12 March 2024 12	Melbourne City	7–0	Western Sydney Wanderers	Melbourne
19:00 AEDT	Arslan 30', 32'; Natel 39'; Caputo 42'; Reis 72'; Maclaren 77'; Antonis 82'	Report		Stadium: AAMI Park; Attendance: 2,182; Referee: Jack Morgan
Note: Originally scheduled for 13 January 2024, was moved due to Unite Round. It was later rescheduled again.

30 March 2024 22	Melbourne City	0–0	Newcastle Jets	Melbourne
17:30 AEDT		Report		Stadium: AAMI Park; Attendance: 5,534; Referee: Daniel Cook

2 April 2024 21	Central Coast Mariners	2–1	Melbourne City	Gosford
19:00 AEDT	Torres 54' (pen.); Balard 90+3'	Report	Arslan 50'	Stadium: Industree Group Stadium; Attendance: 3,266; Referee: Jonathon Barreiro
Note: Originally scheduled for 17 March 2024, was moved due to Central Coast Mariners participating in the 2023–24 AFC Cup.

6 April 2024 23	Melbourne Victory	2–1	Melbourne City	Melbourne
19:45 AEDT	Fornaroli 34' (pen.); Da Silva 86'	Report	Arslan 4'	Stadium: AAMI Park; Attendance: 20,107; Referee: Alireza Faghani

14 April 2024 24	Melbourne City	8–0	Perth Glory	Melbourne
15:00 AEST	Natel 14', 29'; Arslan 16', 26', 73'; Majekodunmi 19' (o.g.); Maclaren 60'; Ugarkovic 86'	Report		Stadium: AAMI Park; Attendance: 4,580; Referee: Tim Danaskos

20 April 2024 25	Western Sydney Wanderers	1–2	Melbourne City	Sydney
15:30 AEST	Younis 69'	Report	Natel 28'; Jakoliš 39'	Stadium: CommBank Stadium; Attendance: 10,098; Referee: Ben Abraham

28 April 2024 26	Melbourne City	1–0	Western United	Melbourne
17:00 AEST	Maclaren 19'	Report		Stadium: AAMI Park; Attendance: 7,402; Referee: Adam Kersey

==== Finals series ====
5 May 2024 Elimination-final	Melbourne Victory	1–1 (a.e.t.) (3–2 p)	Melbourne City	Melbourne
17:00 AEST	Velupillay 88'	Report	Souprayen 29'	Stadium: AAMI Park; Attendance: 21,358; Referee: Alex King
	Penalties
	Miranda (penalty scored); Da Silva (penalty scored); Izzo (penalty scored); Broxham (penalty missed)		(penalty scored) Natel; (penalty missed) Antonis; (penalty missed) Talbot; (penalty scored) Caputo; (penalty missed) Jeggo

=== Australia Cup ===
13 August 2023 Round of 32	Oakleigh Cannons	2–3	Melbourne City	Melbourne
14:00 AEST	Hampson 1'; Salmon 57'	Report	Arslan 49' (pen.), 80' (pen.); Lopane 90+4'	Stadium: Jack Edwards Reserve; Attendance: 2,652; Referee: Adam Kersey

27 August 2023 Round of 16	Melbourne City	3–0	Wellington Phoenix	Melbourne
14:00 AEST	Arslan 37'; Maclaren 76', 78'	Report		Stadium: Jack Edwards Reserve; Attendance: 1,153; Referee: Lachlan Keevers

14 September 2023 Quarter-finals	North Eastern MetroStars	1–2	Melbourne City	Adelaide
19:00 ACST	Ayoubi 27'	Report	Good 84'; Arslan 90+5'	Stadium: T.K. Shutter Reserve; Attendance: 2,022; Referee: Shaun Evans

24 September 2023 Semi-finals	Melbourne City	1–2	Sydney FC	Melbourne
15:00 AEST	Maclaren 89'	Report	Wood 38'; Lolley 73'	Stadium: AAMI Park; Attendance: 2,267; Referee: Jack Morgan

=== AFC Champions League ===
==== Group stage ====
Pos	Team	Pld	W	D	L	GF	GA	GD	Pts	Qualification
1	(Japan) Ventforet Kofu	6	3	2	1	11	8	+3	11	Advance to round of 16
2	(Australia) Melbourne City	6	2	3	1	8	6	+2	9	
3	(China) Zhejiang	6	2	1	3	9	13	−4	7	
4	(Thailand) Buriram United	6	2	0	4	9	10	−1	6	

Source: AFC
Rules for classification: Tiebreakers

20 September 2023 1	Melbourne City (Australia)	0–0	(Japan) Ventforet Kofu	Melbourne
20:00 AEDT		Report		Stadium: Melbourne Rectangular Stadium; Attendance: 3,245; Referee: Salman Ahmad Falahi (Qatar)

4 October 2023 2	Zhejiang (China)	1–2	(Australia) Melbourne City	Huzhou, China
20:00 UTC+8	Leonardo 19' (pen.)	Report	Behich 4'; Caputo 17'	Stadium: Huzhou Olympic Sports Centre; Attendance: 18,798; Referee: Hanna Hattab (Syria)

25 October 2023 3	Buriram United (Thailand)	0–2	(Australia) Melbourne City	Buriram, Thailand
17:00 IT		Report	Lopane 22'; Maclaren 41'	Stadium: Buriram Stadium; Attendance: 17,265; Referee: Omar Mohamed Al Ali (United Arab Emirates)

8 November 2023 4	Melbourne City (Australia)	0–1	(Thailand) Buriram United	Melbourne
20:00 AEDT		Report	Čaušić 86' (pen.)	Stadium: Melbourne Rectangular Stadium; Attendance: 2,472; Referee: Majed Al-Shamrani (Saudi Arabia)

29 November 2023 5	Ventforet Kofu (Japan)	3–3	(Australia) Melbourne City	Tokyo, Japan
19:00 JST	Inoue 8'; Torikai 43'; Miyazaki 85'	Report	Talbot 5'; Arslan 59' (pen.); Jakoliš 64'	Stadium: Japan National Stadium; Attendance: 15,877; Referee: Mouood Bonyadifar (Iran)

12 December 2023 6	Melbourne City (Australia)	1–1	(China) Zhejiang	Melbourne
20:30 AEDT	Arslan 54'	Report	Mushekwi 90+9'	Stadium: Princes Park; Attendance: 2,487; Referee: Kim Hee-gon (South Korea)
Note: Match was originally scheduled to be played at AAMI Park at 20:00 AEDT, but due to the venue's unavailability was rescheduled to Princes Park at 20:30 AEDT.

== Statistics ==
=== Appearances and goals ===
Includes all competitions. Players with no appearances not included in the list.

As of 5 May 2024

No.	Pos.	Nat.	Player	A-League Men		A-League Men Finals		Australia Cup		AFC Champions League		Total					
No.	Pos.	Nat.	Player	Apps	Goals	Apps	Goals	Apps	Goals	Apps	Goals	Apps	Goals				
No.	Pos.	Nat.	Player	1	GK	(England)	Jamie Young	27	0	1	0	4	0	6	0	38	0
2	DF	(Australia)	Scott Galloway	9+3	0	0	0	0+1	0	0+4	0	17	0				
4	DF	(Portugal)	Nuno Reis	12+3	1	0	0	3	0	4	0	22	1				
6	DF	(Australia)	Steven Ugarkovic	22+4	3	1	0	4	0	5	0	36	3				
7	FW	(Australia)	Mathew Leckie	6+6	1	1	0	2	0	1+1	0	17	1				
8	MF	(Australia)	Jimmy Jeggo	11+2	0	1	0	0	0	0	0	14	0				
9	FW	(Australia)	Jamie Maclaren	22+5	10	1	0	3	3	5+1	1	37	14				
10	MF	(Germany)	Tolgay Arslan	23	13	1	0	4	4	6	2	34	19				
11	FW	(Brazil)	Léo Natel	19+5	6	1	0	0	0	3+1	0	29	6				
14	DF	(Chile)	Vicente Fernández	10+1	0	1	0	0	0	0	0	12	0				
15	FW	(Australia)	Andrew Nabbout	4+6	0	0	0	0+1	0	0	0	11	0				
17	MF	(Australia)	Terry Antonis	5+16	5	0+1	0	0+4	0	0+2	0	28	5				
18	DF	(Australia)	Jordon Hall	3+1	0	0	0	2+1	0	0	0	7	0				
21	MF	(Australia)	Alessandro Lopane	10+14	1	0+1	0	3	1	3+2	1	33	3				
22	DF	(Australia)	Curtis Good	19+1	1	1	0	3	1	6	0	30	2				
23	FW	(Australia)	Marco Tilio	2+2	1	0	0	0	0	0	0	4	1				
25	DF	(Australia)	Callum Talbot	20+2	0	0+1	0	3	0	4+1	1	31	1				
26	DF	(France)	Samuel Souprayen	20	1	1	1	2+1	0	4+1	0	29	2				
35	MF	(Australia)	Zane Schreiber	0+5	0	0+1	0	0+2	0	0	0	8	0				
37	FW	(Australia)	Max Caputo	5+15	1	0+1	0	1+2	0	1+1	1	26	2				
38	DF	(Australia)	Harry Politidis	2+10	0	0	0	0+1	0	0+3	0	16	0				
44	FW	(Croatia)	Marin Jakoliš	20+3	2	1	0	4	0	6	1	34	3				
46	FW	(Australia)	Benjamin Mazzeo	3+7	2	0	0	0	0	0+2	0	12	2				
50	FW	(Australia)	Medin Memeti	0	0	0	0	0+1	0	0	0	1	0				
53	DF	(Australia)	Harrison Shillington	0	0	0	0	0+1	0	0	0	1	0				
Player(s) transferred out but featured this season
8	MF	(Morocco)	Hamza Sakhi	13	0	0	0	3	0	5+1	0	22	0				
16	DF	(Australia)	Aziz Behich	10	0	0	0	3	0	6	1	19	1				

=== Disciplinary record ===
Includes all competitions. The list is sorted by squad number when total cards are equal. Players with no cards not included in the list.

As of 5 May 2024

Rank	No.	Pos.	Nat.	Name	A-League Men			A-League Men Finals			Australia Cup			AFC Champions League			Total		
Rank	No.	Pos.	Nat.	Name	Yellow card	(yellow card) (yellow-red card)	Red card	Yellow card	(yellow card) (yellow-red card)	Red card	Yellow card	(yellow card) (yellow-red card)	Red card	Yellow card	(yellow card) (yellow-red card)	Red card	Yellow card	(yellow card) (yellow-red card)	Red card
1	10	MF	(Germany)	Tolgay Arslan	3	0	1	0	0	0	0	0	0	2	0	0	5	0	1
2	22	DF	(Australia)	Curtis Good	3	0	0	0	1	0	0	0	0	0	0	0	3	1	0
3	44	FW	(Croatia)	Marin Jakoliš	4	0	0	0	0	0	0	0	0	2	0	0	6	0	0
3	6	MF	(Australia)	Steven Ugarkovic	3	0	0	0	0	0	1	0	0	2	0	0	6	0	0
5	8	MF	(Australia)	Jimmy Jeggo	4	0	0	1	0	0	0	0	0	0	0	0	5	0	0
5	25	DF	(Australia)	Callum Talbot	5	0	0	0	0	0	0	0	0	0	0	0	5	0	0
7	11	FW	(Brazil)	Léo Natel	4	0	0	0	0	0	0	0	0	0	0	0	4	0	0
7	17	MF	(Australia)	Terry Antonis	3	0	0	1	0	0	0	0	0	0	0	0	4	0	0
7	26	DF	(France)	Samuel Souprayen	3	0	0	1	0	0	0	0	0	0	0	0	4	0	0
10	4	DF	(Portugal)	Nuno Reis	1	0	0	0	0	0	0	0	0	2	0	0	3	0	0
10	21	MF	(Australia)	Alessandro Lopane	2	0	0	0	0	0	0	0	0	1	0	0	3	0	0
12	1	GK	(England)	Jamie Young	2	0	0	0	0	0	0	0	0	0	0	0	2	0	0
12	7	FW	(Australia)	Matthew Leckie	2	0	0	0	0	0	0	0	0	0	0	0	2	0	0
12	9	FW	(Australia)	Jamie Maclaren	0	0	0	1	0	0	0	0	0	1	0	0	2	0	0
12	14	DF	(Chile)	Vicente Fernández	2	0	0	0	0	0	0	0	0	0	0	0	2	0	0
12	15	FW	(Australia)	Andrew Nabbout	2	0	0	0	0	0	0	0	0	0	0	0	2	0	0
12	37	FW	(Australia)	Max Caputo	1	0	0	0	0	0	0	0	0	1	0	0	2	0	0
18	2	DF	(Australia)	Scott Galloway	1	0	0	0	0	0	0	0	0	0	0	0	1	0	0
18	18	DF	(Australia)	Jordon Hall	0	0	0	0	0	0	1	0	0	0	0	0	1	0	0
Player(s) transferred out but featured this season
1	16	DF	(Australia)	Aziz Behich	3	0	0	0	0	0	1	0	0	1	0	0	5	0	0
2	8	MF	(Morocco)	Hamza Sakhi	4	0	0	0	0	0	0	0	0	0	0	0	4	0	0
Total					52	0	1	4	1	0	3	0	0	11	0	0	70	1	1

=== Clean sheets ===
Includes all competitions. The list is sorted by squad number when total clean sheets are equal. Numbers in parentheses represent games where both goalkeepers participated and both kept a clean sheet; the number in parentheses is awarded to the goalkeeper who was substituted on, whilst a full clean sheet is awarded to the goalkeeper who was on the field at the start and end of play. Goalkeepers with no clean sheets not included in the list.

As of 5 May 2024

Rank	No.	Nat.	Goalkeeper	A-League Men	A-League Men Finals	Australia Cup	AFC Champions League	Total
1	1	(England)	Jamie Young	10	0	1	2	13
Total				10	0	1	2	13

== See also ==
- 2023–24 Melbourne City FC (A-League Women) season
