= 2021–22 Melbourne City FC season =

12th season in existence of Melbourne City FC

Melbourne City
2021–22 season
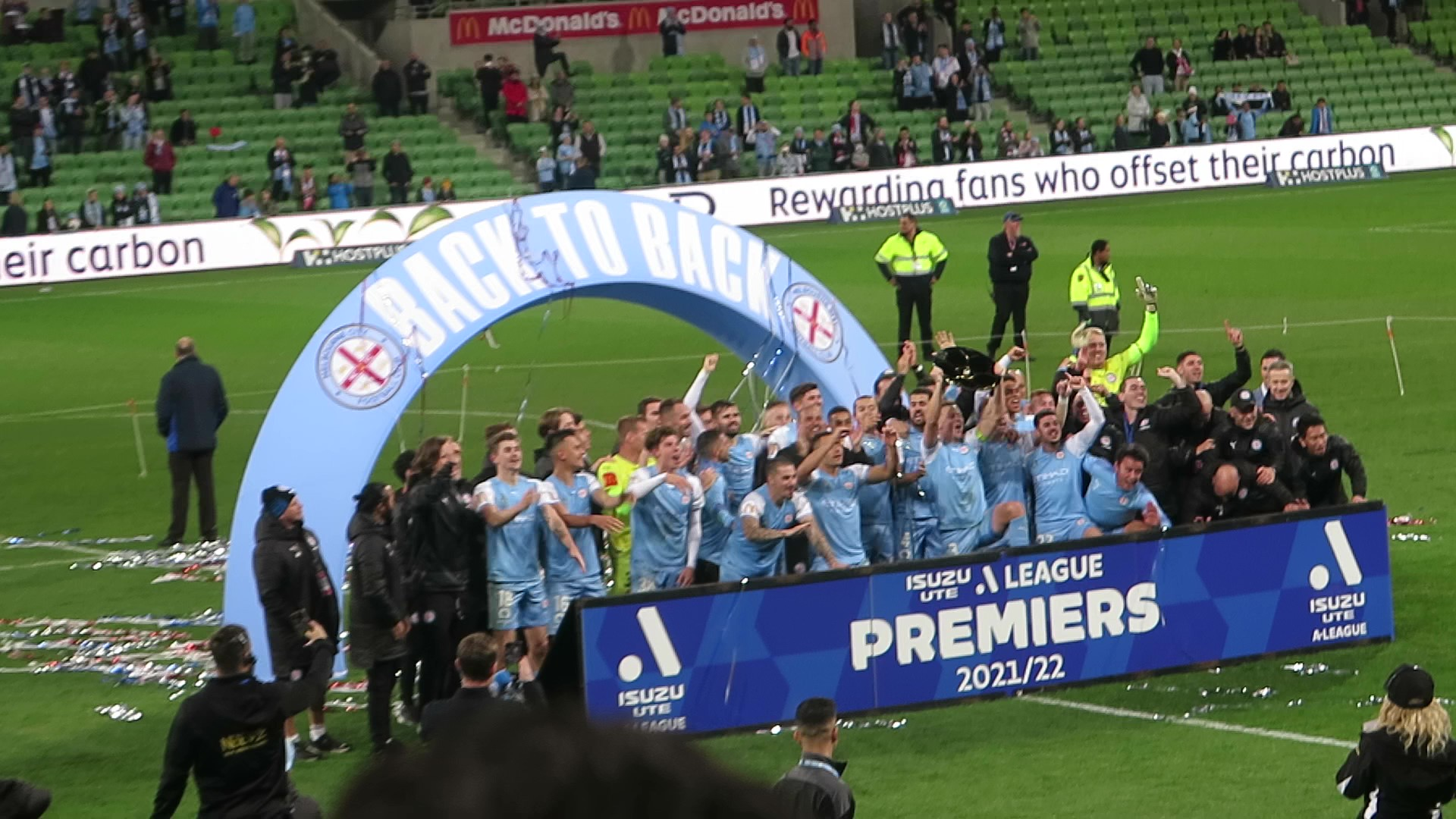
- Melbourne City players celebrating their 2021–22 A-League Men Premiership trophy win at AAMI Park
- Chairman: Khaldoon Al Mubarak
- Manager: Patrick Kisnorbo
- Stadium: AAMI Park
- A-League Men: 1st
- A-League Men Finals: Runners-up
- FFA Cup: Quarter-finals
- AFC Champions League: Group stage
- Top goalscorer: League: Jamie Maclaren (16); All: Jamie Maclaren (18)
- Highest home attendance: 19,640 vs. Melbourne Victory (18 December 2021); A-League Men
- Lowest home attendance: 1,485 vs. Wellington Phoenix (5 January 2022); FFA Cup
- Average home league attendance: 7,782
- Biggest win: 6–0 vs Wellington Phoenix (A) (2 April 2022); A-League Men
- Biggest defeat: 0–3 vs Melbourne Victory (A) (9 April 2022); A-League Men
Home colours	Away colours	Third colours

The 2021–22 season was the 12th in the history of Melbourne City Football Club In addition to the domestic league, Melbourne City also competed in the FFA Cup and AFC Champions League. They were managed by Patrick Kisnorbo and captained by Scott Jamieson.

== Players ==
=== First-team squad ===
As of 29 April 2022

Note: Flags indicate national team as defined under FIFA eligibility rules; some limited exceptions apply. Players may hold more than one non-FIFA nationality.

No.	Pos.	Nation	Player
1	GK	AUS	Tom Glover
2	DF	AUS	Scott Galloway
3	DF	AUS	Scott Jamieson (captain)
4	DF	POR	Nuno Reis
5	DF	AUS	Rostyn Griffiths
6	DF	ENG	Carl Jenkinson (on loan from Nottingham Forest)
7	FW	AUS	Mathew Leckie
8	MF	AUS	Aiden O'Neill
9	FW	AUS	Jamie Maclaren
10	MF	FRA	Florin Berenguer
14	MF	JPN	Tsubasa Endoh
15	FW	AUS	Andrew Nabbout
16	MF	AUS	Taras Gomulka
17	FW	MKD	Stefan Colakovski

No.	Pos.	Nation	Player
18	MF	AUS	Connor Metcalfe
20	MF	ITA	Manuel Pucciarelli
22	DF	AUS	Curtis Good
23	FW	AUS	Marco Tilio
33	GK	AUS	Matt Sutton
34	DF	AUS	Jordon Hall
35	FW	AUS	Raphael Borges Rodrigues (Scholarship)
36	DF	AUS	Kerrin Stokes (Scholarship)
37	FW	AUS	Max Caputo (Scholarship)
38	DF	AUS	Jordan Bos (Scholarship)
39	MF	AUS	Anthony Lesiotis (Scholarship)
40	GK	AUS	James Nieuwenhuizen (Scholarship)
42	GK	AUS	Ahmad Taleb (Scholarship)

== Transfers ==
=== Transfers in ===
No.	Pos.	Player	Transferred from	Type/fee	Contract length	Date	Ref.
7	FW	Mathew Leckie	Unattached	Free transfer	3 years	4 June 2021	
21	MF	Ramy Najjarine	Newcastle Jets	End of loan	(1 year)	11 June 2021	
30	FW	Moudi Najjar	Macarthur FC	End of loan	(1 year)	30 June 2021	
34	DF	Jordon Hall	(Australia) Green Gully	Free transfer	2 years	24 August 2021	
20	MF	(Italy) Manuel Pucciarelli	Unattached	Free transfer	2 years	20 September 2021	
6	DF	(England) Carl Jenkinson	(England) Nottingham Forest	Loan	6 months	19 January 2022	
14	FW	(Japan) Tsubasa Endoh	Unattached	Free transfer	6 months	1 February 2022	

=== Transfers out ===
No.	Pos.	Player	Transferred to	Type/fee	Date	Ref.
21	MF	Ramy Najjarine	Western Sydney Wanderers	Mutual contract termination	30 June 2021	
30	FW	Moudi Najjar	Macarthur FC	Mutual contract termination	30 June 2021	
14	FW	(Japan) Naoki Tsubaki	(Japan) Yokohama F. Marinos	End of loan	6 July 2021	
11	FW	(England) Craig Noone	Macarthur FC	End of contract	10 July 2021	
20	MF	(Uruguay) Adrián Luna	Unattached	End of contract	17 July 2021	
19	DF	Ben Garuccio	Western United	Mutual contract termination	17 July 2021	
13	DF	Nathaniel Atkinson	(Scotland) Heart of Midlothian	Undisclosed	24 December 2021	

=== Contract extensions ===
No.	Pos.	Player	Contract length	Date	Notes	Ref.
9	FW	Jamie Maclaren	2 years	23 June 2021	Contract extended from end of 2021-22 until end of 2023-24	
3	DF	Scott Jamieson	2 years	2 July 2021		
10	MF	(France) Florin Berenguer	1 year	21 July 2021		
39	MF	Anthony Lesiotis	1 year	6 August 2021	Scholarship extension	
38	DF	Jordan Bos	3 years	30 September 2021	Scholarship extension	
2	DF	Scott Galloway	3 years	2 October 2021		
23	FW	Marco Tilio	2 years	20 October 2021	Contract extended from end of 2021-22 until end of 2023-24	
35	FW	Raphael Borges Rodrigues	1 year	26 October 2021	Contract extended from end of 2021-22 until end of 2022-23	
10	MF	(France) Florin Berenguer	1 year	1 March 2022	Contract extended from end of 2021-22 until end of 2022-23	
4	DF	(Portugal) Nuno Reis	1 year	12 May 2022	Contract extended from end of 2022-23 until end of 2023-24	

== Pre-season and friendlies ==
Win Draw Loss

10 September 2021	Western United (Australia)	1–2	(Australia) Melbourne City	Melbourne
11:00 AEST	Wenzel-Halls 90'	Report	Leckie 53'; Maclaren 62'	Stadium: City Vista Pavilion and Sports Field

1 November 2021	Melbourne City (Australia)	1–1	(Australia) Western United	Melbourne
	Leckie 21'	Report	Topor-Stanley 51'	Stadium: Casey Fields; Attendance: 0 (behind closed doors)

5 November 2021	Western United (Australia)	1–3	(Australia) Melbourne City	Geelong
	Pierias 125'	Report	Colakovski 75' (pen.); ? 93' (o.g.); Maclaren 105' (pen.)	Stadium: GMHBA Stadium; Attendance: 0 (behind closed doors)
Note: The match was played over 135 minutes

== Competitions ==
=== Overview ===
Competition	First match	Last match	Starting round	Final position	Record							
Competition	First match	Last match	Starting round	Final position	Pld	W	D	L	GF	GA	GD	Win %
A-League Men	19 November 2021	9 May 2022	Matchday 1	Winners	26	14	7	5	55	33	+22	53.85
A-League Men Finals	18 May 2022	28 May 2022	Semi-finals	Runners-up	3	1	1	1	2	3	−1	33.33
FFA Cup	12 November 2021	5 January 2022	Round of 32	Quarter-finals	3	2	1	0	4	0	+4	66.67
AFC Champions League	15 April 2022	30 April 2022	Group stage	2nd in Group G	6	3	3	0	10	3	+7	50.00
Total					38	20	12	6	71	39	+32	52.63

Last updated: 10 May 2022
Source: Competitions

=== A-League Men ===
==== League table ====
Pos	Team	Pld	W	D	L	GF	GA	GD	Pts	Qualification
1	Melbourne City	26	14	7	5	55	33	+22	49	Qualification for finals series and 2023–24 AFC Champions League group stage (Note: Determined by which of the Premiers for the 2021–22 or 2022–23 seasons accrued the most combined points over both seasons. Melbourne City qualified as they were Premiers in both seasons.)
2	Melbourne Victory	26	13	9	4	42	25	+17	48	Qualification for finals series (Note: The top two teams enter the finals series at the semi-finals, while the teams ranked third to sixth enter the finals series at the elimination-finals.)
3	Western United (C)	26	13	6	7	40	30	+10	45	Qualification for finals series
4	Adelaide United	26	12	7	7	38	31	+7	43	Qualification for finals series
5	Central Coast Mariners	26	12	6	8	49	35	+14	42	Qualification for finals series

Source: A-Leagues
Rules for classification: 1) Points; 2) Goal difference; 3) Goals scored; 4) Points per game; 5) Least red cards; 6) Least yellow cards; 7) Toss of a coin in an event of a tie of two clubs.
(C) Champions

==== Results summary ====
Overall								Home						Away					
Pld	W	D	L	GF	GA	GD	Pts	W	D	L	GF	GA	GD	W	D	L	GF	GA	GD
26	14	7	5	55	33	+22	49	7	4	2	27	16	+11	7	3	3	28	17	+11

Source: Ultimate A-League

==== Results by round ====
Round	1	2	3	4	5	26	10	22	12	7	14	24	15	8	16	13	9	19	18	6	20	21	11	23	25	21
Ground	H	A	H	H	H	H	A	A	A	A	A	H	H	H	A	H	H	A	H	A	A	A	H	H	A	H
Result	W	D	L	W	D	D	D	W	L	W	W	L	W	W	W	D	W	D	D	W	W	W	W	L	L	W
Position	3	4	4	7	8	1	1	1	1	2	1	1	1	1	1	1	1	1	1	5	1	1	1	1	1	1
Points	3	4	4	7	8	9	10	13	13	16	19	19	22	25	28	29	32	33	34	37	40	43	46	46	46	49

Source: Ultimate A-League
A = Away; H = Home; W = Win; D = Draw; L = Loss

==== Matches ====
Win Draw Loss

19 November 2021 1	Melbourne City	2–1	Brisbane Roar	Melbourne
19:45 AEDT	Good 40'; Metcalfe 43'	Report	Ivanovic 71'	Stadium: AAMI Park; Attendance: 7,213; Referee: Jonathon Barreiro

27 November 2021 2	Adelaide United	2–2	Melbourne City	Adelaide
19:15 ACDT	Mauk 78'; Halloran 90'	Report	Maclaren 28'; Nabbout 61'	Stadium: Coopers Stadium; Attendance: 7,017; Referee: Daniel Elder

4 December 2021 3	Melbourne City	0–1	Western United	Melbourne
19:45 AEDT		Report	Wenzel-Halls 20'	Stadium: AAMI Park; Attendance: 7,019; Referee: Alex King

8 December 2021 4	Melbourne City	1–0	Perth Glory	Melbourne
19:45 AEDT	Atkinson 88'	Report		Stadium: AAMI Park; Attendance: 4,081; Referee: Ben Abraham

18 December 2021 5	Melbourne City	2–2	Melbourne Victory	Melbourne
19:45 AEDT	Maclaren 60'; Nabbout 63'	Report	Margiotta 12'; D'Agostino 81'	Stadium: AAMI Park; Attendance: 19,640; Referee: Chris Beath

9 January 2022 26	Melbourne City	3–3	Western Sydney Wanderers	Melbourne
18:45 AEDT	Petratos 16' (o.g.); Maclaren 36'; Tilio 60'	Report	Troisi 5'; Rodwell 9'; Ogawa 68'	Stadium: AAMI Park; Attendance: 3,376; Referee: Alex King

15 January 2022 10	Adelaide United	2–2	Melbourne City	Adelaide
18:15 ACDT	Blackwood 60'; Ibusuki 84'	Report	Nabbout 24'; Maclaren 66'	Stadium: Hindmarsh Stadium; Attendance: 5,614; Referee: Chris Beath

23 January 2022 22	Central Coast Mariners	1–3	Melbourne City	Gosford
16:05 AEST	Ureña 41'	Report	Maclaren 18'; Nabbout 57'; Jenkinson 84'	Stadium: Central Coast Stadium; Attendance: 3,733; Referee: Stephen Lucas

29 January 2022 12	Western United	1–0	Melbourne City	Melbourne
19:45 AEDT	Lustica 71'	Report		Stadium: AAMI Park; Attendance: 4,740; Referee: Ben Abraham

8 February 2022 7	Newcastle Jets	2–4	Melbourne City	Newcastle
20:05 AEDT	Mikeltadze 59' (pen.); Thurgate 84'	Report	Warland 40' (o.g.); Maclaren 52', 66'; Leckie 56'	Stadium: McDonald Jones Stadium; Attendance: 3,403; Referee: Alireza Faghani

11 February 2022 14	Western Sydney Wanderers	1–3	Melbourne City	Sydney
19:45 AEDT	Petratos 80' (pen.)	Report	Leckie 36', 43'; Berenguer 64'	Stadium: CommBank Stadium; Attendance: 4,515; Referee: Alex King

15 February 2022 24	Melbourne City	1–2	Adelaide United	Melbourne
19:55 AEDT	Maclaren 11'	Report	Lopez 20'; Toure 85'	Stadium: AAMI Park; Attendance: 2,728; Referee: Shaun Evans

18 February 2022 15	Melbourne City	3–0	Newcastle Jets	Melbourne
19:45 AEDT	Maclaren 45+2'; Leckie 52'; Jenkinson 64'	Report		Stadium: AAMI Park; Attendance: 4,294; Referee: Tim Danaskos

22 February 2022 8	Melbourne City	3–2	Central Coast Mariners	Melbourne
19:55 AEDT	Maclaren 45+7' (pen.); Berenguer 57'; Tilio 74'	Report	Nkololo 45'; Bozanic 65'	Stadium: AAMI Park; Attendance: 2,587; Referee: Shaun Evans

26 February 2022 16	Sydney FC	0–3 (Note: Awarded score. Original score 1–2 to Melbourne City; result was changed after Australian Professional Leagues determined there were insufficient players on the match list for Sydney FC below a certain age.)	Melbourne City	Sydney
19:45 AEDT	Ninković 53'	Report	Retre 32' (o.g.); Leckie 90+1'	Stadium: Netstrata Jubilee Stadium; Attendance: 3,262; Referee: Chris Beath

2 March 2022 13	Melbourne City	2–2	Perth Glory	Melbourne
19:05 AEDT	Berenguer 8'; Leckie 29'	Report	Fornaroli 31'; Timmins 56'	Stadium: AAMI Park; Attendance: 2,584; Referee: Alex King

9 March 2022 9	Melbourne City	3–1	Macarthur FC	Melbourne
19:05 AEDT	Mariappa 28' (o.g.); Berenguer 44'; Maclaren 54' (pen.)	Report	Giannou 15'	Stadium: AAMI Park; Attendance: 2,716; Referee: Jonathon Barreiro

12 March 2022 19	Western United	2–2	Melbourne City	Melbourne
17:05 AEDT	Lacroix 16'; Krhin 30'	Report	Metcalfe 42'; Maclaren 65'	Stadium: AAMI Park; Attendance: 8,127; Referee: Alireza Faghani

19 March 2022 18	Melbourne City	1–1	Melbourne Victory	Melbourne
19:45 AEDT	Good 45'	Report	Rojas 19'	Stadium: AAMI Park; Attendance: 18,080; Referee: Alex King

23 March 2022 6	Brisbane Roar	1–2	Melbourne City	Brisbane
19:35 AEST	Hore 9'	Report	Trewin 14' (o.g.); Rodrigues 49'	Stadium: Moreton Daily Stadium; Attendance: 3,059; Referee: Kurt Ams

26 March 2022 20	Macarthur FC	0–1	Melbourne City	Sydney
19:45 AEDT		Report	Maclaren 64'	Stadium: Campbelltown Stadium; Attendance: 2,713; Referee: Alex King

2 April 2022 21	Wellington Phoenix	0–6	Melbourne City	Sydney
17:05 AEDT		Report	Surman 17' (o.g.); Leckie 50'; Nabbout 59'; Good 68'; Tilio 76', 81'	Stadium: PointsBet Stadium; Attendance: 0 (No spectators permitted); Referee: Adam Kersey

6 April 2022 11	Melbourne City	4–0	Sydney FC	Melbourne
19:05 AEST	Bos 26'; Leckie 55', 72'; Maclaren 70'	Report		Stadium: AAMI Park; Attendance: 3,222; Referee: Alex King

9 April 2022 23	Melbourne Victory	3–0	Melbourne City	Melbourne
19:45 AEST	Brimmer 7' (pen.); Rojas 14', 27'	Report		Stadium: AAMI Park; Attendance: 17,754; Referee: Chris Beath

4 May 2022 25	Perth Glory	2–0	Melbourne City	Perth
19:05 AWST	Timmins 5', 67'	Report		Stadium: HBF Park; Attendance: 3,095; Referee: Alex King

9 May 2022 21	Melbourne City	2–1	Wellington Phoenix	Melbourne
19:05 AEST	Sutton 3' (o.g.); Maclaren 10'	Report	Waine 54'	Stadium: AAMI Park; Attendance: 7,350; Referee: Daniel Elder

==== Finals series ====
===== Semi-finals =====
18 May 2022 First leg	Adelaide United	0–0	Melbourne City	Adelaide
18:35 ACST		Report		Stadium: Coopers Stadium; Attendance: 9,279; Referee: Chris Beath

22 May 2022 Second leg	Melbourne City	2–1 (a.e.t.) (2–1 agg.)	Adelaide United	Melbourne
14:05 AEST	Tilio 74'; Maclaren 92'	Report	Clough 48'	Stadium: AAMI Park; Attendance: 9,347; Referee: Alireza Faghani

===== Grand Final =====
28 May 2022 Grand Final	Melbourne City	0–2	Western United	Melbourne
19:45 AEST		Report	Reis 2' (o.g.); Prijović 31'	Stadium: AAMI Park; Attendance: 22,495; Referee: Chris Beath

=== FFA Cup ===
Win Draw Loss

12 November 2021 Round of 32	South Melbourne	0–3	Melbourne City	Melbourne
19:30 AEDT		Report	Metcalfe 23'; Galloway 66', 73'	Stadium: Lakeside Stadium; Attendance: 4,291; Referee: Lachlan Keevers

1 December 2021 Round of 16	Hume City	0–1	Melbourne City	Melbourne
19:30 AEDT		Report	Leckie 20'	Stadium: ABD Stadium; Attendance: 2,148; Referee: Lachlan Keevers

5 January 2022 Quarter-finals	Melbourne City	0–0 (a.e.t.) (3–4 p)	Wellington Phoenix	Melbourne
19:30 AEDT		Report		Stadium: Kingston Heath Soccer Complex; Attendance: 1,485; Referee: Ben Abraham
	Penalties
	Griffiths (penalty missed); O'Neill (penalty scored); Galloway (penalty missed); Metcalfe (penalty scored); Jamieson (penalty missed); Colakovski (penalty scored); Tilio (penalty missed)		(penalty scored) Waine; (penalty missed) Laws; (penalty missed) Fenton; (penalty missed) Rufer; (penalty scored) Sotirio; (penalty scored) Lewis; (penalty scored) Pennington

=== AFC Champions League ===
==== Group stage ====
The draw for the group stage was held on 17 January 2022. Despite finishing the group stage undefeated with 3 wins and 3 draws; Melbourne City finished in second place due to goal difference, missing out on an automatic spot in the knockout stage of the tournament. They also didn't advance as one of the best runner-ups, due to Jeonbuk Hyundai Motors, Urawa Red Diamonds, and Kitchee performing better than them in their respective groups.

Pos	Team	Pld	W	D	L	GF	GA	GD	Pts	Qualification	BGP	MCY	JND	UCT
1	(Thailand) BG Pathum United (H)	6	3	3	0	11	2	+9	12	Advance to Round of 16	—	1–1	0–0	5–0
2	(Australia) Melbourne City	6	3	3	0	10	3	+7	12		0–0	—	2–1	3–0
3	(South Korea) Jeonnam Dragons	6	2	2	2	5	5	0	8		0–2	1–1	—	2–0
4	(Philippines) United City	6	0	0	6	1	17	−16	0		1–3	0–3	0–1	—

Source: AFC
Rules for classification: Tiebreakers
(H) Hosts

Win Draw Loss

15 April 2022 1	BG Pathum United (Thailand)	1–1	(Australia) Melbourne City	Pathum Thani, Thailand
18:00 ICT	Teerasil 35'	Report	Nabbout 22'	Stadium: Pathum Thani Stadium; Attendance: 3,189; Referee: Mooud Bonyadifar (Iran)

18 April 2022 2	Melbourne City (Australia)	3–0	(Philippines) United City	Pathum Thani, Thailand
21:00 ICT	Colakovski 34'; Tilio 59', 75'	Report		Stadium: Pathum Thani Stadium; Attendance: 243; Referee: Sadullo Gulmurodi (Tajikistan)

21 April 2022 3	Melbourne City (Australia)	2–1	(South Korea) Jeonnam Dragons	Pathum Thani, Thailand
21:00 ICT	Jenkinson 12'; Nabbout 22'	Report	Lee Kyu-hyuk 16'	Stadium: Pathum Thani Stadium; Attendance: 437; Referee: Yoshimi Yamashita (Japan)

24 April 2022 4	Jeonnam Dragons (South Korea)	1–1	(Australia) Melbourne City	Pathum Thani, Thailand
18:00 ICT	Kacharava 90+2'	Report	Maclaren 89'	Stadium: Pathum Thani Stadium; Attendance: 256; Referee: Mooud Bonyadifar (Iran)

27 April 2022 5	Melbourne City (Australia)	0–0	(Thailand) BG Pathum United	Pathum Thani, Thailand
18:00 ICT		Report		Stadium: Pathum Thani Stadium; Attendance: 3,699; Referee: Ammar Al-Jeneibi (United Arab Emirates)

30 April 2022 6	United City (Philippines)	0–3	(Australia) Melbourne City	Pathum Thani, Thailand
21:00 ICT		Report	Rodrigues 22'; Maclaren 68'; Tilio 90'	Stadium: Pathum Thani Stadium; Attendance: 1,014; Referee: Saoud Al Athbah (Qatar)

== Statistics ==
=== Appearances and goals ===
Includes all competitions. Players with no appearances not included in the list.

No.	Pos.	Nat.	Name	A-League Men				FFA Cup		AFC Champions League		Total	
No.	Pos.	Nat.	Name	Regular season		Finals series		FFA Cup		AFC Champions League		Total	
No.	Pos.	Nat.	Name	Apps	Goals	Apps	Goals	Apps	Goals	Apps	Goals	Apps	Goals
1	GK	(Australia)	Tom Glover	24	0	3	0	3	0	6	0	36	0
2	DF	(Australia)	Scott Galloway	13+2	0	0+1	0	2	2	1	0	19	2
3	DF	(Australia)	Scott Jamieson	18+2	0	3	0	2	0	5+1	0	31	0
4	DF	(Portugal)	Nuno Reis	17+2	0	3	0	1+2	0	4	0	29	0
5	MF	(Australia)	Rostyn Griffiths	12+3	0	1+1	0	3	0	5	0	25	0
6	DF	(England)	Carl Jenkinson	16+3	2	3	0	0	0	4+2	1	28	3
7	FW	(Australia)	Mathew Leckie	18+2	9	3	0	1+1	1	1	0	26	10
8	MF	(Australia)	Aiden O'Neill	21	0	0	0	1+1	0	0	0	23	0
9	FW	(Australia)	Jamie Maclaren	24	15	3	1	0	0	4+2	2	33	18
10	MF	(France)	Florin Berenguer	23+1	5	2	0	2	0	0	0	28	5
14	MF	(Japan)	Tsubasa Endoh	0+5	0	0	0	0	0	3+1	0	9	0
15	FW	(Australia)	Andrew Nabbout	25	5	3	0	1+1	0	4+1	2	35	7
16	MF	(Australia)	Taras Gomulka	5+12	0	2+1	0	1	0	6	0	27	0
17	FW	(North Macedonia)	Stefan Colakovski	2+14	0	0+2	0	1+1	0	3+3	1	26	1
18	MF	(Australia)	Connor Metcalfe	20+2	2	3	0	1+1	1	3+1	0	31	3
20	MF	(Australia)	Manuel Pucciarelli	0+3	0	0	0	2	0	0+1	0	6	0
22	DF	(Australia)	Curtis Good	20	3	3	0	2	0	4	0	29	3
23	FW	(Australia)	Marco Tilio	12+10	4	1+2	1	3	0	5	3	33	8
33	GK	(Australia)	Matt Sutton	2	0	0	0	0	0	0	0	2	0
34	DF	(Australia)	Jordon Hall	2+2	0	0	0	0	0	1+1	0	6	0
35	FW	(Australia)	Raphael Borges Rodrigues	2+3	1	0	0	1+1	0	2+1	1	10	2
36	DF	(Australia)	Kerrin Stokes	3	0	0	0	2	0	1	0	6	0
37	FW	(Australia)	Max Caputo	0+1	0	0	0	0	0	0	0	1	0
38	DF	(Australia)	Jordan Bos	6+6	1	0+1	0	2+1	0	4+2	0	22	1
39	FW	(Australia)	Anthony Lesiotis	0	0	0	0	1+2	0	0	0	3	0
47	MF	(Australia)	Jordi Valadon	0	0	0	0	0	0	0+4	0	4	0
48	MF	(Australia)	Luke Oresti	0	0	0	0	0+1	0	0	0	1	0
Player(s) transferred out but featured this season
13	MF	(Australia)	Nathaniel Atkinson	1+3	1	0	0	1	0	0	0	5	1

=== Disciplinary record ===
Includes all competitions. The list is sorted by squad number when total cards are equal. Players with no cards not included in the list.

Rank	No.	Pos.	Nat.	Name	A-League						FFA Cup			AFC Champions League			Total		
Rank	No.	Pos.	Nat.	Name	Regular season			Finals series			FFA Cup			AFC Champions League			Total		
Rank	No.	Pos.	Nat.	Name	Yellow card	(yellow card) (yellow-red card)	Red card	Yellow card	(yellow card) (yellow-red card)	Red card	Yellow card	(yellow card) (yellow-red card)	Red card	Yellow card	(yellow card) (yellow-red card)	Red card	Yellow card	(yellow card) (yellow-red card)	Red card
1	9	FW	(Australia)	Jamie Maclaren	3	0	1	0	0	0	0	0	0	0	0	0	3	0	1
2	4	DF	(Portugal)	Nuno Reis	4	1	0	1	0	0	0	0	0	2	0	0	7	1	0
3	22	DF	(Australia)	Curtis Good	3	1	0	0	0	0	0	0	0	0	0	0	3	1	0
4	3	DF	(Australia)	Scott Jamieson	8	0	0	0	0	0	0	0	0	0	0	0	8	0	0
4	23	FW	(Australia)	Marco Tilio	4	0	0	1	0	0	1	0	0	2	0	0	8	0	0
6	15	FW	(Australia)	Andrew Nabbout	5	0	0	1	0	0	0	0	0	1	0	0	7	0	0
7	8	MF	(Australia)	Aiden O'Neill	6	0	0	0	0	0	0	0	0	0	0	0	6	0	0
7	18	MF	(Australia)	Connor Metcalfe	5	0	0	1	0	0	0	0	0	0	0	0	6	0	0
9	6	DF	(England)	Carl Jenkinson	4	0	0	0	0	0	0	0	0	0	0	0	4	0	0
9	7	FW	(Australia)	Mathew Leckie	2	0	0	2	0	0	0	0	0	0	0	0	4	0	0
9	10	MF	(France)	Florin Berenguer	4	0	0	0	0	0	0	0	0	0	0	0	4	0	0
9	17	FW	(North Macedonia)	Stefan Colakovski	2	0	0	1	0	0	0	0	0	1	0	0	4	0	0
13	1	GK	(Australia)	Tom Glover	2	0	0	0	0	0	0	0	0	1	0	0	3	0	0
13	16	MF	(Australia)	Taras Gomulka	2	0	0	0	0	0	0	0	0	1	0	0	3	0	0
13	36	DF	(Australia)	Kerrin Stokes	2	0	0	0	0	0	1	0	0	0	0	0	3	0	0
13	38	DF	(Australia)	Jordan Bos	2	0	0	0	0	0	0	0	0	1	0	0	3	0	0
17	2	DF	(Australia)	Scott Galloway	2	0	0	0	0	0	0	0	0	0	0	0	2	0	0
17	5	DF	(Australia)	Rostyn Griffiths	1	0	0	0	0	0	0	0	0	1	0	0	2	0	0
19	13	DF	(Australia)	Nathaniel Atkinson	1	0	0	0	0	0	0	0	0	0	0	0	1	0	0
19	14	MF	(Japan)	Tsubasa Endoh	1	0	0	0	0	0	0	0	0	0	0	0	1	0	0
19	20	MF	(Italy)	Manuel Pucciarelli	0	0	0	0	0	0	1	0	0	0	0	0	1	0	0
19	34	DF	(Australia)	Jordon Hall	1	0	0	0	0	0	0	0	0	0	0	0	1	0	0
Total					64	1	1	7	0	0	3	0	0	10	0	0	84	1	1

=== Clean sheets ===
Includes all competitions. The list is sorted by squad number when total clean sheets are equal. Numbers in parentheses represent games where both goalkeepers participated and both kept a clean sheet; the number in parentheses is awarded to the goalkeeper who was substituted on, whilst a full clean sheet is awarded to the goalkeeper who was on the field at the start of play. Goalkeepers with no clean sheets not included in the list.

Rank	No.	Nat.	Goalkeeper	A-League Men		FFA Cup	ACL	Total
Rank	No.	Nat.	Goalkeeper	Regular season	Finals series	FFA Cup	ACL	Total
1	1	(Australia)	Tom Glover	5	1	3	3	12

== See also ==
- 2021–22 in Australian soccer
- List of Melbourne City FC seasons
