= Jordon Hall =

English footballer

Personal information
- Full name: Jordon Lewis Hall
- Date of birth: 23 March 1998 (age 28)
- Place of birth: Manchester, England
- Height: 1.87 m (6 ft 2 in)
- Position: Centre back

Team information
- Current team: Oakleigh Cannons
- Number: 2

Youth career
- Sutherland Sharks
- 2017–2018: Western Sydney Wanderers
- 2018–2019: Melbourne City

Senior career*
Years	Team	Apps	(Gls)
2019–2021	Green Gully	64	(0)
2021–2024	Melbourne City	10	(0)
2024–	Oakleigh Cannons	1	(0)
- * Club domestic league appearances and goals as of 2 July 2024

Jordon Lewis Hall (born 23 March 1998) is an Australian professional footballer who plays as a centre back for Oakleigh Cannons.

== Early life ==
Hall was born in England, but migrated to Australia at the age of 12 and grew up in Sydney, New South Wales. He comes from a futsal background.

== Youth career ==
Hall spent the 2017–18 and 2018–19 seasons playing for the Western Sydney Wanderers Youth and Melbourne City Youth respectively. Hall made 9 appearances for the Wanderers in the 2017–18 Y-League season, including a 3–1 grand final victory against his future club, Melbourne City.

== Club career ==
=== Green Gully (2019–21) ===
After the 2018–19 season, Hall joined Green Gully SC after being in Melbourne City's academy system. Hall spent two season at Green Gully making 17 appearances for the club.

=== Melbourne City (2021–2024) ===
On 24 August 2021, Hall signed with Melbourne City on a two-year deal. Hall made his debut for the club on 15 January 2022, when he came off the bench in the 83rd minute for Connor Metcalfe in a 2-2 draw against Adelaide United. Hall also made two appearances for the club in the 2022 AFC Champions League. City went on to win the A-League Men premiership for the 2021–22 season.

On 7 October 2022, Hall made an appearance in the opening match for the 2022–23 A-League Men season in a grand final re-match from the previous season against Western United; coming on for Thomas Lam in the 65th minute. City went onto win the match 2–1. Hall went on to make one more appearance for the club that season, being a part of Melbourne City's third consecutive A-League Men premiership.

On 9 August 2023, Hall re-signed with Melbourne City on a one-year contract extension until the end of the 2023–24 A-League Men season.

=== Oakleigh Cannons (2024–present) ===
Hall scored against Heidelberg United in the 2024 Australia Cup round of 16 at the Home of the Matildas. The match finished 1–1, with Oakleigh advancing after winning the penalty shootout 4–1.

== Career statistics ==
As of 2 September 2024

Club	Season	League			National Cup		Continental		Total	
Club	Season	Division	Apps	Goals	Apps	Goals	Apps	Goals	Apps	Goals
Green Gully	2019	NPL Victoria	26	2	0	0	—		26	2
Green Gully	2020	NPL Victoria	5	0	—		—		5	0
Green Gully	2021	NPL Victoria	17	0	0	0	—		17	0
Green Gully	Total		48	2	0	0	0	0	48	2
Melbourne City	2021–22	A-League Men	4	0	0	0	2	0	6	0
Melbourne City	2022–23	A-League Men	2	0	0	0	—		2	0
Melbourne City	2023–24	A-League Men	4	0	3	0	0	0	7	0
Melbourne City	Total		10	0	3	0	2	0	15	0
Oakleigh Cannons	2024	NPL Victoria	1	0	2	1	—		3	1
Oakleigh Cannons	Total		1	0	2	1	0	0	3	1
Career total			59	2	5	1	2	0	66	3

== Honours ==
Melbourne City

- A-League Men Premiership: 2021–22, 2022–23

Western Sydney Wanderers

- Y-League Premiership: 2017–18
