= 2022–23 Melbourne City FC season =

13th season in existence of Melbourne City FC

Melbourne City
2022–23 season
- Owner: City Football Group
- Chairman: Khaldoon Al Mubarak
- Manager: Patrick Kisnorbo (to 23 November 2022); Rado Vidošić (from 23 November 2022)
- Stadium: AAMI Park
- A-League Men: 1st
- A-League Men Finals: Runners-up
- Australia Cup: Round of 16
- Top goalscorer: League: Jamie Maclaren (24); All: Jamie Maclaren (24)
- Highest home attendance: 18,036 vs. Melbourne Victory (17 December 2022); A-League Men
- Lowest home attendance: 2,067 vs. Wellington Phoenix (17 August 2022); Australia Cup
- Average home league attendance: 6,677
- Biggest win: 6–1 vs. Macarthur FC (H) (4 February 2023); A-League Men
- Biggest defeat: 1–6 vs. Central Coast Mariners (N) (3 June 2023); A-League Men Grand Final
Home colours	Away colours	Third colours
- All statistics correct as of 19 May 2023.

The 2022–23 season was the 13th in the history of Melbourne City Football Club. In addition to the domestic league, Melbourne City also participated in the Australia Cup for the eighth time. They were managed by Rado Vidošić and captained by Scott Jamieson.

== Players ==
=== First-team squad ===
As of 1 February 2023

Note: Flags indicate national team as defined under FIFA eligibility rules; some limited exceptions apply. Players may hold more than one non-FIFA nationality.

No.	Pos.	Nation	Player
1	GK	AUS	Tom Glover
2	DF	AUS	Scott Galloway
3	DF	AUS	Scott Jamieson (captain)
4	DF	POR	Nuno Reis
6	DF	FIN	Thomas Lam
7	FW	AUS	Mathew Leckie
8	MF	NED	Richard van der Venne
9	FW	AUS	Jamie Maclaren
10	MF	FRA	Florin Berenguer
13	MF	AUS	Aiden O'Neill
14	MF	KOS	Valon Berisha (on loan from Reims)
15	FW	AUS	Andrew Nabbout
18	DF	AUS	Jordon Hall

No.	Pos.	Nation	Player
22	DF	AUS	Curtis Good
23	FW	AUS	Marco Tilio
25	DF	AUS	Callum Talbot
30	MF	AUS	Luke Oresti (scholarship)
33	GK	AUS	Matt Sutton
34	FW	AUS	Arion Sulemani (scholarship)
35	FW	AUS	Raphael Borges Rodrigues (scholarship)
36	DF	AUS	Kerrin Stokes (scholarship)
37	FW	AUS	Max Caputo (scholarship)
38	DF	AUS	Jordan Bos (scholarship)
39	MF	AUS	Emin Durakovic (scholarship)
40	GK	AUS	James Nieuwenhuizen (scholarship)

== Transfers ==
=== Transfers in ===
No.	Position	Player	Transferred from	Type/fee	Contract length	Date	Ref.
25	DF	Callum Talbot	Sydney FC	Free transfer	3 years	24 May 2022	
8	MF	(Netherlands) Richard van der Venne	Unattached	Free transfer	2 years	22 June 2022	
6	DF	(Finland) Thomas Lam	Unattached	Free transfer	2 years	16 August 2022	
14	MF	(Kosovo) Valon Berisha	(France) Reims	Loan	1 year	7 September 2022	

==== From youth squad ====
No.	Position	Player	Age	Date	Notes	Ref.
30	MF	Luke Oresti	18	4 January 2022	2 year scholarship contract	
34	FW	Arion Sulemani	16	2 July 2022	2 year scholarship contract	
39	MF	Emin Durakovic	17	2 July 2022	2 year scholarship contract	

=== Transfers out ===
No.	Position	Player	Transferred to	Type/fee	Date	Ref.
18	MF	Connor Metcalfe	(Germany) St. Pauli	Undisclosed	17 February 2022	
17	FW	(North Macedonia) Stefan Colakovski	Perth Glory	End of contract	6 June 2022	
6	DF	(England) Carl Jenkinson	(England) Nottingham Forest	End of loan	7 June 2022	
14	MF	(Japan) Tsubasa Endoh	Unattached	End of contract	7 June 2022	
39	MF	Anthony Lesiotis	Unattached	End of contract	7 June 2022	
42	GK	Ahmad Taleb	Melbourne Victory	Mutual contract termination	27 June 2022	
20	MF	(Italy) Manuel Pucciarelli	Unattached	Mutual contract termination	2 July 2022	
5	DF	Rostyn Griffiths	(India) Mumbai City	End of contract	10 July 2022	
16	MF	Taras Gomulka	Brisbane Roar	Mutual contract termination	1 February 2023	

=== Contract extensions ===
No.	Player	Position	Duration	Date	Ref.
33	Matt Sutton	Goalkeeper	1 year	16 June 2022	

== Pre-season and friendlies ==
Win Draw Loss

26 July 2022	Dandenong Thunder (Australia)	2–3	(Australia) Melbourne City	Melbourne
19:30 AEST	Good 29' (o.g.); Lochhead 37'	Report	Caputo 4'; Bos 9'; Berenguer 44'	Stadium: George Andrews Reserve

3 September 2022	Central Coast Mariners (Australia)	2–0	(Australia) Melbourne City	Gosford
16:00 AEST	Cummings 9'; Ruhs 57'	Report		Stadium: Central Coast Stadium

17 September 2022	Central Coast Mariners (Australia)	4–2	(Australia) Melbourne City	Sydney
10:00 AEST	Ruhs 27'; Silvera 45'; Jok 75'; Duncan 87'	Report	Maclaren 3'; Nabbout 76'	Stadium: Valentine Sports Park

30 September 2022	Melbourne City (Australia)	1–5	(Australia) Adelaide United	Melbourne
	Caputo 118'	Report	Barr 12'; Clough 37'; Blackwood 76'; Jovanovic 122'; Van Der Saag 133'	Stadium: Casey Fields; Attendance: 0 (behind closed doors)
Note: The match was played over 135 minutes

26 November 2022 Greater Bank Tour of Tamworth	Newcastle Jets (Australia)	1–1	(Australia) Melbourne City	Tamworth
17:30 AEDT	Mikeltadze 23'	Report	Berisha 69'	Stadium: Scully Park

== Competitions ==
=== Overall record ===
Competition	First match	Last match	Starting round	Final position	Record							
Competition	First match	Last match	Starting round	Final position	Pld	W	D	L	GF	GA	GD	Win %
A-League Men	7 October 2022	28 April 2023	Matchday 1	Winners	26	16	7	3	61	32	+29	61.54
A-League Men Finals	12 May 2023	3 June 2023	Semi-finals	Runners-up	3	1	1	1	6	7	−1	33.33
Australia Cup	2 August 2022	17 August 2022	Round of 32	Round of 16	2	1	0	1	2	2	+0	50.00
Total					31	18	8	5	69	41	+28	58.06

Source: Soccerway

=== A-League Men ===
==== League table ====
Pos	Team	Pld	W	D	L	GF	GA	GD	Pts	Qualification
1	Melbourne City	26	16	7	3	61	32	+29	55	Qualification for AFC Champions League group stage and Finals series (Note: Determined by which of the Premiers for the 2021–22 or 2022–23 seasons accrued the most combined points over both seasons.)
2	Central Coast Mariners (C)	26	13	5	8	55	35	+20	44	Qualification for AFC Cup group stage and Finals series
3	Adelaide United	26	11	9	6	53	46	+7	42	Qualification for Finals series (Note: The top two teams enter the finals series at the semi-finals, while the teams ranked third to sixth enter the finals series at the elimination-finals.)
4	Western Sydney Wanderers	26	11	8	7	43	27	+16	41	Qualification for Finals series
5	Sydney FC	26	11	5	10	40	39	+1	38	Qualification for Finals series

Source: A-Leagues
Rules for classification: 1) Points; 2) Goal difference; 3) Goals scored; 4) Points per game; 5) Least red cards; 6) Least yellow cards; 7) Toss of a coin in an event of a tie of two clubs.
(C) Champions

==== Results summary ====
Overall								Home						Away					
Pld	W	D	L	GF	GA	GD	Pts	W	D	L	GF	GA	GD	W	D	L	GF	GA	GD
26	16	7	3	61	32	+29	55	10	3	0	37	15	+22	6	4	3	24	17	+7

Source: Ultimate A-League

==== Results by round ====
Round	1	2	3	4	5	6	7	9	10	11	12	13	14	15	16	17	18	19	20	21	22	8 (Note: Matchday 8 (vs. Melbourne Victory) was abandoned after 22 minutes due to player safety and is rescheduled for 5 April 2023.)	23	24	25	26
Ground	H	A	A	H	H	A	A	H	A	H	A	A	H	H	A	A	H	A	H	A	H	H	H	A	A	H
Result	W	W	W	D	W	W	L	W	W	W	D	D	D	W	W	L	W	L	W	D	D	W	W	D	W	W
Position	2	1	1	1	1	1	1	1	1	1	1	1	1	1	1	1	1	1	1	1	1	1	1	1	1	1
Points	3	6	9	10	13	16	16	19	22	25	26	27	28	31	34	34	37	37	40	41	42	45	48	49	52	55

Source: Ultimate A-League
A = Away; H = Home; W = Win; D = Draw; L = Loss

==== Matches ====
Win Draw Loss Fixtures

7 October 2022 1	Melbourne City	2–1	Western United	Melbourne
19:45 AEDT	Lacroix 38' (o.g.); Maclaren 59'	Report	Milanovic 90+2'	Stadium: AAMI Park; Attendance: 7,501; Referee: Shaun Evans

14 October 2022 2	Brisbane Roar	0–2	Melbourne City	Brisbane
19:45 AEDT		Report	Maclaren 22', 38' (pen.)	Stadium: Suncorp Stadium; Attendance: 7,890; Referee: Tim Danaskos

22 October 2022 3	Melbourne Victory	0–2	Melbourne City	Melbourne
19:45 AEDT		Report	Maclaren 17' (pen.); Cadete 19' (o.g.)	Stadium: AAMI Park; Attendance: 23,489; Referee: Alireza Faghani

30 October 2022 4	Melbourne City	2–2	Wellington Phoenix	Melbourne
17:00 AEDT	Maclaren 16' (pen.); Tilio 34'	Report	Sutton 79'; Barbarouses 90'	Stadium: AAMI Park; Attendance: 6,208; Referee: Adam Kersey

5 November 2022 5	Melbourne City	4–0	Perth Glory	Melbourne
17:00 AEDT	Maclaren 49', 75' (pen.); Tilio 82'; Leckie 90+5'	Report		Stadium: AAMI Park; Attendance: 6,171; Referee: Jack Morgan

12 November 2022 6	Newcastle Jets	1–2	Melbourne City	Newcastle
17:00 AEDT	Jamieson 38' (o.g.)	Report	Van der Venne 20'; Maclaren 57'	Stadium: McDonald Jones Stadium; Attendance: 7,234; Referee: Jonathan Barreiro

Mid-season break for 2022 FIFA World Cup

10 December 2022 7	Sydney FC	2–1	Melbourne City	Sydney
19:45 AEDT	Lolley 23'; Le Fondre 61'	Report	Maclaren 22' (pen.)	Stadium: Sydney Football Stadium; Attendance: 14,946; Referee: Adam Kersey

27 December 2022 9	Melbourne City	1–0	Central Coast Mariners	Melbourne
17:00 AEDT	Maclaren 39'	Report		Stadium: AAMI Park; Attendance: 4,341; Referee: Adam Kersey

2 January 2023 10	Wellington Phoenix	1–3	Melbourne City	Wellington
15:00 NZDT	Ball 16'	Report	Leckie 18'; Maclaren 51' (pen.), 90+6'	Stadium: Sky Stadium; Attendance: 6,321; Referee: Alex King

7 January 2023 11	Melbourne City	4–0	Western United	Melbourne
19:45 AEDT	Tilio 9'; Lacroix 12' (o.g.); Maclaren 24'; Nabbout 84'	Report		Stadium: AAMI Park; Attendance: 6,102; Referee: Alireza Faghani

15 January 2023 12	Western Sydney Wanderers	1–1	Melbourne City	Sydney
15:00 AEDT	Borrello 19'	Report	Van der Venne 58'	Stadium: CommBank Stadium; Attendance: 9,887; Referee: Jack Morgan

21 January 2023 13	Brisbane Roar	0–0	Melbourne City	Brisbane
19:45 AEDT		Report		Stadium: Moreton Daily Stadium; Attendance: 5,565; Referee: Alireza Faghani

29 January 2023 14	Melbourne City	3–3	Adelaide United	Melbourne
15:00 AEDT	Lam 12'; Leckie 52'; Maclaren 90+1' (pen.)	Report	Blackwood 1'; Kitto 17'; Goodwin 43'	Stadium: AAMI Park; Attendance: 6,337; Referee: Adam Kersey

4 February 2023 15	Melbourne City	6–1	Macarthur FC	Melbourne
17:00 AEDT	Maclaren 3', 88'; Van der Venne 33', 43', 77'; Nabbout 68'	Report	Najjar 72'	Stadium: AAMI Park; Attendance: 4,252; Referee: Jonathon Barreiro

11 February 2023 16	Perth Glory	2–4	Melbourne City	Perth
19:30 AWST	Clisby 25'; D. Williams 71'	Report	Bos 16'; Berisha 62' (pen.); Leckie 76'; Berenguer 90+2'	Stadium: Macedonia Park; Attendance: 3,991; Referee: Daniel Elder

18 February 2023 17	Melbourne Victory	3–2	Melbourne City	Melbourne
19:45 AEDT	Da Silva 7'; Fornaroli 46'; Brillante 77'	Report	Leckie 24', 80'	Stadium: AAMI Park; Attendance: 18,011; Referee: Alireza Faghani

25 February 2023 18	Melbourne City	3–2	Sydney FC	Melbourne
17:00 AEDT	Maclaren 5', 30'; Tilio 28'	Report	Mak 28'; Caballo 90+6'	Stadium: AAMI Park; Attendance: 5,189; Referee: Shaun Evans

3 March 2023 19	Adelaide United	4–2	Melbourne City	Adelaide
18:15 ACST	Barr 45+3'; Goodwin 50'; D'Arrigo 57'; Irankunda 85'	Report	Nabbout 9'; Tilio 62'	Stadium: Coopers Stadium; Attendance: 10,270; Referee: Alireza Faghani

12 March 2023 20	Melbourne City	2–1	Brisbane Roar	Melbourne
15:00 AEDT	O'Neill 22', 88'	Report	O'Shea 80' (pen.)	Stadium: AAMI Park; Attendance: 4,881; Referee: Jonathon Barreiro

19 March 2023 21	Macarthur FC	1–1	Melbourne City	Sydney
15:00 AEDT	Romero 26'	Report	Aspropotamitis 66' (o.g.)	Stadium: Campbelltown Stadium; Attendance: 2,121; Referee: Chris Beath

2 April 2023 22	Melbourne City	1–1	Newcastle Jets	Melbourne
15:00 AEST	Caputo 90+2'	Report	Mikeltadze 31' (pen.)	Stadium: AAMI Park; Attendance: 4,088; Referee: Jack Morgan

5 April 2023 8	Melbourne City	2–1 (Note: The Melbourne City v Melbourne Victory (17 December 2022) match was abandoned in the 22nd minute with Melbourne City leading 1–0. The match resumed on 5 April 2023 from the 21st minute, with the score resuming at 1–0 to Melbourne City and finished 2–1 to Melbourne City.)	Melbourne Victory	Melbourne
19:00 AEST	O'Neill 11', 57'	Report	Velupillay 89'	Stadium: AAMI Park; Attendance: 18,036 (Note: Attendance was recorded at 6,423 in the continuation of the game); Referee: Alex King

10 April 2023 23	Melbourne City	4–1	Wellington Phoenix	Melbourne
16:00 AEST	Maclaren 34', 52'; Tilio 57', 83'	Report	Ugarkovic 49'	Stadium: AAMI Park; Attendance: 4,821; Referee: Adam Kersey

15 April 2023 24	Central Coast Mariners	1–1	Melbourne City	Gosford
17:00 AEST	Nisbet 78'	Report	Bos 63'	Stadium: Central Coast Stadium; Attendance: 10,556; Referee: Alireza Faghani

22 April 2023 25	Western United	1–3	Melbourne City	Melbourne
19:45 AEST	Pierias 38'	Report	Maclaren 13', 66', 74'	Stadium: AAMI Park; Attendance: 5,753; Referee: Chris Beath

28 April 2023 26	Melbourne City	3–2	Western Sydney Wanderers	Melbourne
19:45 AEST	Tilio 49', 90+3'; Maclaren 75'	Report	Borrello 41'; Milanovic 74'	Stadium: AAMI Park; Attendance: 6,322; Referee: Alireza Faghani

==== Finals series ====
===== Semi-finals =====
12 May 2023 First leg	Sydney FC	1–1	Melbourne City	Sydney
19:45 AEST	Le Fondre 64' (pen.)	Report	Leckie 18'	Stadium: Allianz Stadium; Attendance: 15,322; Referee: Adam Kersey

19 May 2023 Second leg	Melbourne City	4–0 (5–1 agg.)	Sydney FC	Melbourne
19:45 AEST	Good 37'; Rodwell 59' (o.g.); Tilio 67'; van der Venne 82'	Report		Stadium: AAMI Park; Attendance: 9,223; Referee: Shaun Evans

===== Grand Final =====
3 June 2023 Grand Final	Melbourne City	1–6	Central Coast Mariners	Sydney
19:45 AEST	van der Venne 40'	Report	Cummings 20', 66' (pen.), 73' (pen.); Silvera 34'; Nkololo 83'; Moresche 90+1'	Stadium: CommBank Stadium; Attendance: 26,523; Referee: Chris Beath

=== Australia Cup ===
Win Draw Loss

2 August 2022 Round of 32	Newcastle Olympic (New South Wales)	0–1	Melbourne City	Newcastle
19:30 AEST		Report	Oresti 41'	Stadium: Newcastle Number 2 Sports Ground; Attendance: 1,412; Referee: Adam Bavcar

17 August 2022 Round of 16	Melbourne City	1–2	Wellington Phoenix	Melbourne
19:30 AEST	Leckie 84'	Report	Barbarouses 19'; Waine 36'	Stadium: Casey Fields; Attendance: 2,067; Referee: Kurt Ams

== Statistics ==
=== Appearances and goals ===
Includes all competitions. Players with no appearances not included in the list.

No.	Pos.	Nat.	Player	A-League Men				Australia Cup		Total	
No.	Pos.	Nat.	Player	Regular season		Finals series		Australia Cup		Total	
No.	Pos.	Nat.	Player	Apps	Goals	Apps	Goals	Apps	Goals	Apps	Goals
1	GK	(Australia)	Tom Glover	26	0	3	0	2	0	31	0
2	DF	(Australia)	Scott Galloway	2+17	0	0+2	0	1	0	22	0
3	DF	(Australia)	Scott Jamieson	10+11	0	0+2	0	2	0	25	0
4	DF	(Portugal)	Nuno Reis	11+7	0	3	0	2	0	23	0
6	DF	(Finland)	Thomas Lam	23+1	1	2+1	0	0	0	27	1
7	FW	(Australia)	Mathew Leckie	17+2	6	3	1	1+1	1	24	8
8	MF	(Netherlands)	Richard van der Venne	15+5	5	2+1	2	0	0	23	7
9	FW	(Australia)	Jamie Maclaren	26	24	3	0	2	0	31	24
10	MF	(France)	Florin Berenguer	6+9	1	1+2	0	2	0	20	1
13	MF	(Australia)	Aiden O'Neill	25	4	2	0	0	0	27	4
14	MF	(Kosovo)	Valon Berisha	23+1	1	3	0	0	0	27	1
15	FW	(Australia)	Andrew Nabbout	13+12	3	2+1	0	1	0	29	3
18	DF	(Australia)	Jordon Hall	0+2	0	0	0	0	0	2	0
22	DF	(Australia)	Curtis Good	18+1	0	3	1	2	0	24	1
23	FW	(Australia)	Marco Tilio	22+4	9	3	1	2	0	31	10
25	DF	(Australia)	Callum Talbot	20+5	0	1+2	0	1+1	0	30	0
30	MF	(Australia)	Luke Oresti	0	0	0	0	1	1	1	1
35	FW	(Australia)	Raphael Borges Rodrigues	0+2	0	0	0	0	0	2	0
37	MF	(Australia)	Max Caputo	0+4	1	0	0	0+1	0	5	1
38	DF	(Australia)	Jordan Bos	25	2	3	0	1+1	0	30	2
Player(s) transferred out but featured this season
16	MF	(Australia)	Taras Gomulka	3+3	0	0	0	2	0	8	0

=== Disciplinary record ===
Includes all competitions. The list is sorted by squad number when total cards are equal. Players with no cards not included in the list.

Rank	No.	Pos.	Nat.	Name	A-League Men			A-League Men Finals Series			Australia Cup			Total		
Rank	No.	Pos.	Nat.	Name	Booked	(yellow card) (yellow-red card)	Sent off (straight red)	Booked	(yellow card) (yellow-red card)	Sent off (straight red)	Booked	(yellow card) (yellow-red card)	Sent off (straight red)	Booked	(yellow card) (yellow-red card)	Sent off (straight red)
1	16	MF	(Australia)	Taras Gomulka	1	0	1	0	0	0	1	0	0	2	0	1
2	6	DF	(Finland)	Thomas Lam	5	1	0	1	0	0	0	0	0	6	1	0
3	3	DF	(Australia)	Scott Jamieson	4	1	0	0	0	0	1	0	0	5	1	0
4	13	MF	(Australia)	Aiden O'Neill	4	1	0	0	0	0	0	0	0	4	1	0
5	25	DF	(Australia)	Callum Talbot	6	0	0	0	0	0	0	0	0	6	0	0
6	4	DF	(Portugal)	Nuno Reis	4	0	0	1	0	0	0	0	0	5	0	0
7	8	MF	(Netherlands)	Richard van der Venne	4	0	0	0	0	0	0	0	0	4	0	0
8	7	FW	(Australia)	Matthew Leckie	3	0	0	0	0	0	0	0	0	3	0	0
8	14	MF	(Kosovo)	Valon Berisha	3	0	0	0	0	0	0	0	0	3	0	0
8	23	FW	(Australia)	Marco Tilio	3	0	0	0	0	0	0	0	0	3	0	0
8	38	DF	(Australia)	Jordan Bos	3	0	0	0	0	0	0	0	0	3	0	0
12	1	GK	(Australia)	Tom Glover	2	0	0	0	0	0	0	0	0	2	0	0
12	9	FW	(Australia)	Jamie Maclaren	2	0	0	0	0	0	0	0	0	2	0	0
12	10	MF	(France)	Florin Berenguer	0	0	0	0	0	0	2	0	0	2	0	0
12	15	FW	(Australia)	Andrew Nabbout	2	0	0	0	0	0	0	0	0	2	0	0
12	22	DF	(Australia)	Curtis Good	1	0	0	1	0	0	0	0	0	2	0	0
17	22	DF	(Australia)	Scott Galloway	1	0	0	0	0	0	0	0	0	1	0	0
Total					39	3	1	2	0	0	4	0	0	45	3	1

=== Clean sheets ===
Includes all competitions. The list is sorted by squad number when total clean sheets are equal. Numbers in parentheses represent games where both goalkeepers participated and both kept a clean sheet; the number in parentheses is awarded to the goalkeeper who was substituted on, whilst a full clean sheet is awarded to the goalkeeper who was on the field at the start and end of play. Goalkeepers with no clean sheets not included in the list.

Rank	No.	Nat.	Goalkeeper	A-League Men	A-League Men Finals Series	Australia Cup	Total
1	1	(Australia)	Tom Glover	6	1	1	8
Total				6	1	1	8
