= Curtis Good =

Australian soccer player

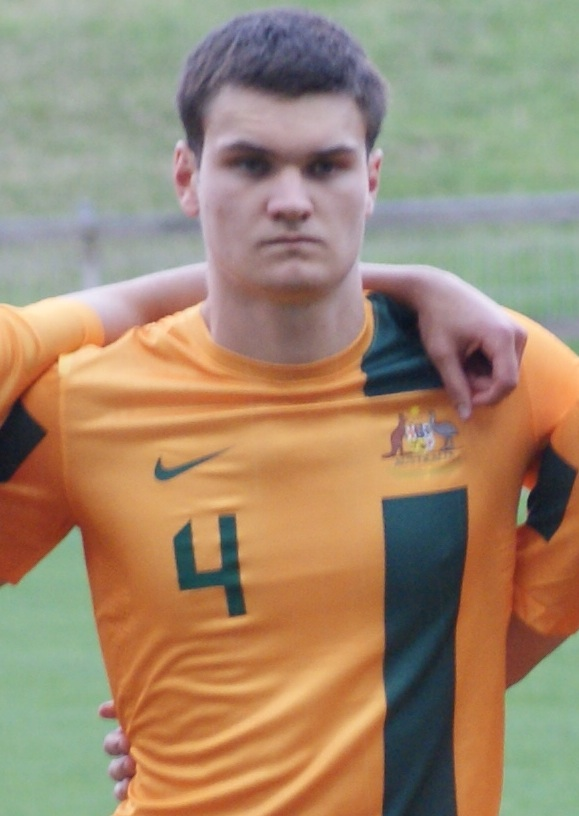
- Good with Australia U-20 in 2013

Personal information
- Full name: Curtis Edward Good
- Date of birth: 23 March 1993 (age 33)
- Place of birth: Melbourne, Australia
- Height: 1.95 m (6 ft 5 in)
- Position: Centre-back

Team information
- Current team: Buriram United
- Number: 6

Youth career
- 2008: Nunawading City
- 2009: VIS
- 2009–2010: AIS

Senior career*
Years	Team	Apps	(Gls)
2011–2012	Melbourne Heart	25	(1)
2012–2018	Newcastle United	0	(0)
2012–2013	→ Bradford City (loan)	3	(0)
2014	→ Dundee United (loan)	4	(1)
2018–2024	Melbourne City	133	(7)
2024–	Buriram United	0	(0)

International career^{‡}
2011–2013	Australia U20	13	(0)
2013	Australia U23	2	(0)
2014–2021	Australia	2	(0)
- * Club domestic league appearances and goals as of 7 May 2024 ‡ National team caps and goals as of 8 June 2021

Curtis Edward Good (born 23 March 1993) is an Australian soccer player who currently plays as a centre-back for Buriram United in the Thai League 1.

He began his career with the club (then called Melbourne Heart) before signing for Newcastle United in 2012. He subsequently had loan spells with Bradford City – for whom he appeared in the 2013 Football League Cup Final – and Dundee United. After being released by Newcastle, he returned to Melbourne in 2018. Good made his international debut for Australia in 2014 and was in the provisional squad for that year's World Cup, but missed out on selection through injury. With 180 appearances in all competitions, Good is Melbourne City's all time most capped player.

== Club career ==
=== Melbourne Heart ===
Good was born in Melbourne, Victoria and attended Wesley College. While growing up, Good met Jackson Irvine when "they were both ten and lived two minutes from each other and grew up together". They would also "ran cross countries together, played for Knox City (in Melbourne) as juniors".

In 2008, he was offered a two-year scholarship at the Australian Institute of Sport which he commenced in Canberra in 2009. In February 2011 Good signed a multi-year senior contract with A-League club Melbourne Heart after impressing as a short-term injury replacement. His first league appearance for Melbourne Heart was in round 1 of the 2011–12 A-League season against Newcastle Jets.

=== Newcastle United ===
In July 2012, Good, having been granted a work permit, joined English Premier League club Newcastle United on a six-year deal for a reported transfer fee of $600,000 AUD. Good was named on the substitute bench for the first time for the senior side in the defeat away to Manchester City in March 2013. He made his debut for Newcastle in their 2–0 League Cup win over Morecambe on 28 August 2013.

==== Bradford City loan ====
In November 2012, after several appearances for Newcastle's reserves, Good signed on loan for Bradford City. He made his senior debut in English football for The Bantams in a 1–1 draw against Brentford in the second round of the FA Cup. He was not registered by the 12pm deadline on the day of the game, causing Bradford City to initially be removed from the FA Cup. This was however reduced to a £1,000 fine on appeal. In February 2013, Good appeared for Bradford in the 2013 Football League Cup Final at Wembley as half-time substitute, won 5–0 by Premier League opponents Swansea City.

==== Dundee United loan ====
On 31 January 2014, Good signed for Scottish Premiership club Dundee United on loan until the end of the 2013–14 season.

==== Return to Newcastle ====
Following his return from injury, Good next appeared for Newcastle's first team when he started on 28 January 2017 in a 3–0 FA Cup defeat against Oxford United. He was released at the end of the 2017–18 season.

=== Melbourne City ===
Good completed a return to Australia on 18 September 2018 by rejoining Melbourne City; who were previously known as Melbourne Heart. He signed contract extensions on 8 July 2019 (two years), and on 11 January 2021(three years). On 29 June 2021, he was named Melbourne City's Player of the Year, after helping the team win the A-League. He was a crucial member of Melbourne City's third-straight A-League title.

Good played his final match for Melbourne City in a Melbourne Derby elimination final against Melbourne Victory. Good was sent off in the 118th minute of the match for a second bookable offence after bringing down a goalbound Nishan Velupillay, as Melbourne City lost 3–2 on penalties after the match ended 1–1 in regulation time.

== International career ==
Good represented Australia at U20 level at the 2012 AFC U-19 Championship in United Arab Emirates and at the 2013 FIFA U-20 World Cup in Turkey.

Good made his international debut for Australia starting in a friendly match against Ecuador on 5 March 2014. He suffered a hip injury in the match against Ecuador and missed the rest of the 2013–14 club season, but was still named in Australia's provisional 30-man squad for the 2014 FIFA World Cup. He was withdrawn from the squad after failing to recover from his injury.

Good made his first appearance in a World Cup Qualifier on 7 June 2021 in a World Cup Qualifier against Taiwan.

== Career statistics ==
=== Club ===
As of 31 May 2025

Club	Season	League			National cup (Note: Includes Australia Cup, FA Cup, Thai FA Cup)		League cup (Note: Includes EFL Cup, Thai League Cup)		Continental		Other		Total	
Club	Season	Division	Apps	Goals	Apps	Goals	Apps	Goals	Apps	Goals	Apps	Goals	Apps	Goals
Melbourne Heart	2011–12	A-League	24	1	—		—		—		—		25	1
Bradford City (loan)	2012–13	League Two	3	0	1	0	3	0	—		2 (Note: Appearances in Football League Trophy)	0	9	0
Newcastle United	2013–14	Premier League	0	0	0	0	1	0	—		0	0	1	0
Newcastle United	2016–17	Championship	0	0	1	0	0	0	—		0	0	1	0
Newcastle United	Total		0	0	1	0	1	0	—		0	0	2	0
Dundee United (loan)	2013–14	Scottish Premiership	4	1	1	0	0	0	—		0	0	5	1
Melbourne City	2018–19	A-League	17	0	3	0	—		—		—		20	0
Melbourne City	2019–20	A-League	26	1	—		—		—		—		26	1
Melbourne City	2020–21	A-League	24	1	—		—		—		—		24	1
Melbourne City	2021–22	A-League Men	23	3	2	0	—		4 (Note: Appearances in AFC Champions League)	0	—		29	3
Melbourne City	2022–23	A-League Men	22	1	3	1	—		—		—		25	2
Melbourne City	2023–24	A-League Men	21	1	—		—		6	0	—		27	1
Melbourne City	Total		133	7	8	1	—		10	0	—		151	8
Buriram United	2024–25	Thai League 1	0	0	4	0	4	0	18 (Note: Ten appearances and one goal in AFC Champions League Elite, eight appearances and one goal in ASEAN Club Championship)	2	—		26	2
Buriram United	2025–26	Thai League 1	0	0	0	0	0	0	0	0	0	0	0	0
Buriram United	Total		0	0	4	0	4	0	18	2	0	0	26	2
Career total			164	9	15	1	8	0	28	2	2	0	217	12

=== International ===
As of match played 7 June 2021

Australia
Year	Apps	Goals
2014	1	0
2021	1	0
Total	2	0

== Honours ==
Bradford City

- Football League Cup runner-up: 2012–13

Melbourne City

- A-League Champion: 2020–21
- A-League Premiership: 2020–21, 2021–22, 2022–23

Buriram United

- Thai FA Cup: 2024–25
- Thai League Cup: 2024–25
- ASEAN Club Championship: 2024–25

Individual

- A-Leagues All Star: 2022
- PFA A-League Team of the Season: 2020–21, 2021–22, 2022–23
- ASEAN Club Championship: Allstar XI 2024–25
