= Callum Talbot =

Australian soccer player

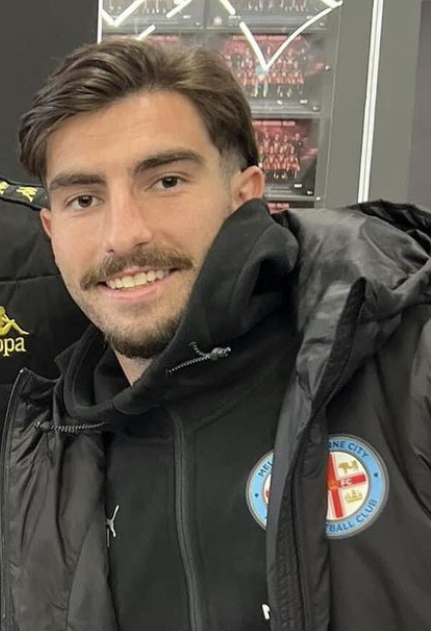
- Talbot with Melbourne City in 2023

Personal information
- Full name: Callum Talbot
- Date of birth: 26 February 2001 (age 25)
- Place of birth: Valletta, Malta
- Height: 1.75 m (5 ft 9 in)
- Position: Right-back

Team information
- Current team: Macarthur FC
- Number: 25

Youth career
- Gymea United
- Sutherland Sharks
- 2015–2019: FNSW NTC

Senior career*
Years	Team	Apps	(Gls)
2019–2021	Sydney FC NPL	41	(2)
2021–2022	Sydney FC	18	(0)
2022–2025	Melbourne City	74	(0)
2025–	Macarthur FC	25	(1)

International career^{‡}
2021–2024	Australia U23	9	(0)
- * Club domestic league appearances and goals as of 1 October 2026 ‡ National team caps and goals as of 27 March 2024

Callum Talbot (/ˈtælbət/; born 26 February 2001) is a professional soccer player who plays as a right-back for A-League Men club Macarthur FC. Born in Malta, he played for the Australia under-23 national team.

== Early life ==
Talbot was born on 26 February 2001 in Valletta, Malta, and moved to Australia in 2003 (aged two). He is of English and Scottish descent.

== Club career ==
=== Sydney FC ===
Talbot played for Gymea United before moving on to Sutherland Sharks and then the Football New South Wales National Training Centre (FNSW NTC) in 2015, going on to link up with Sydney FC's NPL side in 2019, at the age of 18.

On 30 January 2021, Talbot made his professional debut for Sydney in the club's A-League fixture against Macarthur FC. Sydney went on to beat Macarthur 3-0.

=== Melbourne City ===
On 24 May 2022, A-League side Melbourne City announced the signing of Talbot on a three-year-deal, following his release from Sydney.

Talbot played in Melbourne City's losing 2023 Grand Final to the Central Coast Mariners, and in their winning 2025 Grand Final against Melbourne Victory.

Talbot left Melbourne City after 3 seasons.

=== Macarthur FC ===
Shortly after leaving Melbourne City, Talbot returned to Sydney to play for Macarthur FC.

== Career statistics ==
As of match played on 12 January 2024

Club statistics
Club	Season	League			National Cup		Continental		Other		Total	
Club	Season	Division	Apps	Goals	Apps	Goals	Apps	Goals	Apps	Goals	Apps	Goals
Sydney FC	2020–21	A-League	1	0	0	0	—		—		1	0
Sydney FC	2021–22	A-League	17	0	0	0	5 (Note: Appearances in the AFC Champions League)	0	—		22	0
Sydney FC	Total		18	0	0	0	5	0	0	0	23	0
Melbourne City	2022–23	A-League	25	0	2	0	—		3 (Note: Appearances in the A-League Men finals series)	0	30	0
Melbourne City	2023–24	A-League	11	0	3	0	5	1	—		19	1
Melbourne City	Total		36	0	5	0	5	1	3	0	49	1
Career totals			54	0	5	0	10	1	3	0	72	1

== Honours ==
Melbourne City

- A-League Men Championship: 2024–25
- A-League Men Premiership: 2022–23
