= Nuno Reis =

Portuguese footballer

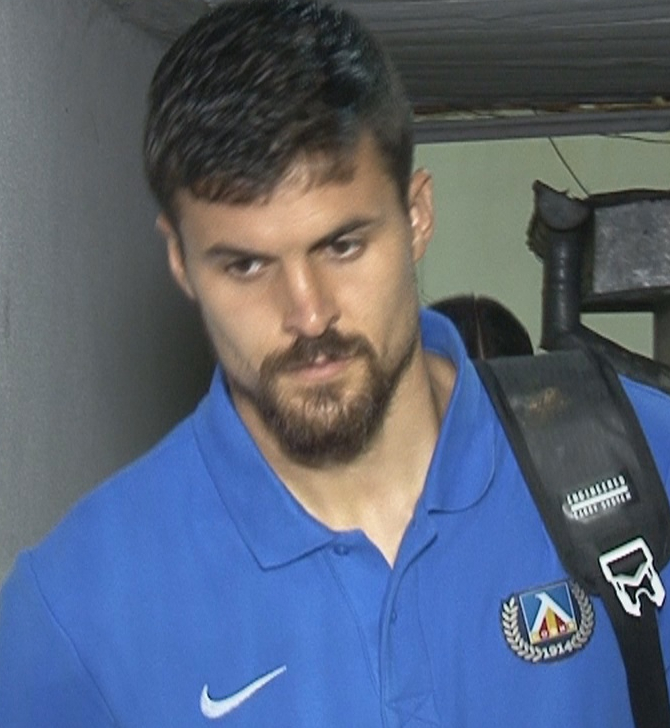
- Reis with Levski Sofia in 2018

Personal information
- Full name: Nuno Miguel Pereira Reis
- Date of birth: 31 January 1991 (age 35)
- Place of birth: Murten, Switzerland
- Height: 1.82 m (6 ft 0 in)
- Position: Centre-back

Team information
- Current team: Chennaiyin

Youth career
- 2001–2003: ADRC Vasco da Gama
- 2003–2010: Sporting CP

Senior career*
Years	Team	Apps	(Gls)
2010–2015	Sporting CP	0	(0)
2010–2012	→ Cercle Brugge (loan)	56	(1)
2012–2013	→ Olhanense (loan)	21	(0)
2013–2015	Sporting CP B	54	(1)
2014	→ Cercle Brugge (loan)	12	(0)
2015–2016	Metz	27	(0)
2016–2018	Panathinaikos	25	(0)
2018	Vitória Setúbal	15	(0)
2018–2020	Levski Sofia	44	(1)
2021–2024	Melbourne City	78	(1)
2024–2025	Mohun Bagan	0	(0)
2025–2026	União Santarém	11	(0)
2026	Mumbai City	13	(0)
2026–	Chennaiyin	2	(0)

International career
2006–2007	Portugal U16	12	(1)
2007–2008	Portugal U17	11	(1)
2008	Portugal U18	2	(0)
2008–2010	Portugal U19	29	(6)
2010–2011	Portugal U20	19	(0)
2011–2012	Portugal U21	2	(0)
Medal record
Men's football
Representing Portugal
FIFA U-20 World Cup
Runner-up	2011 Colombia
- * Club domestic league appearances and goals as of 17 October 2026

Nuno Miguel Pereira Reis CvIH (born 31 January 1991) is a Portuguese professional footballer who plays mainly as a centre-back for Indian Super League club Chennaiyin.

Brought up at Sporting CP, where he was only a reserve, he spent most of his career abroad, winning three A-League Premierships and a Championship with Melbourne City in Australia.

Reis earned 75 caps and scored eight goals for Portugal across all youth levels, captaining the under-20 team to second place at the 2011 World Cup.

== Club career ==
=== Sporting CP ===
Born in Murten, Switzerland to Portuguese immigrants, Reis was raised in Santa Catarina da Serra near Leiria, joining Sporting CP's youth ranks in 2003 at the age of 12 from Fátima-based Associação Desportiva Recreativa Cultural Vasco da Gama. During his formative years with the Lisbon club he won eight titles (including five national championships), going on to be part of the junior sides that conquered three consecutive leagues and being captain during the last year. In addition, he was called up for two first-team games, against C.F. Os Belenenses and Atlético Madrid (the latter in the UEFA Europa League).

After graduating from Sporting's academy, Reis was loaned out to Cercle Brugge KSV in Belgium alongside teammate Renato Neto. In his first season in the Pro League he scored one goal in 32 appearances (all starts), helping the team to finish in ninth position.

On 29 January 2014, after one season with S.C. Olhanense – with which he made his Primeira Liga debut– and five months with Sporting B, Reis returned to Cercle Brugge on loan for the remainder of the campaign.

=== Journeyman ===
Reis left Sporting on 27 June 2015, signing a two-year deal at FC Metz which was orchestrated by the former's director Carlos Freitas. He played 30 competitive matches as the campaign ended in promotion to Ligue 1, before he and compatriot André Santos were released.

On 5 July 2016, Reis penned a three-year contract at Panathinaikos F.C. of the Super League Greece, on the recommendation of their director Gilberto Silva. He left the club in January 2018 after making 37 appearances in all competitions, his only goal coming in a 4–0 win against Asteras Tripolis F.C. in the domestic cup.

Reis returned to his country of adoption on 28 January 2018, signing with Vitória F.C. until June 2020. On 5 September, however, he moved abroad again after agreeing to a three-year deal at PFC Levski Sofia.

=== Melbourne City ===
On 18 January 2021, Reis signed with A-League's Melbourne City FC for three years. He played 20 games in his first season, ending with a 3–1 final win over Sydney FC on 27 June.

Reis scored his only goal on 12 March 2024, contributing to the 7–0 home rout of Western Sydney Wanderers FC. He won a further two leagues until the end of his spell.

=== Later career ===
On 15 September 2024, Reis joined Indian Super League club Mohun Bagan Super Giant. In February 2026, following a short stint in his country with União de Santarém, the 35-year-old returned to India with Mumbai City FC.

Staying in the country for the 2026–27 campaign, Reis moved to Chennaiyin FC.

== International career ==
Reis captained the Portugal under-20 side to the second place at the 2011 FIFA World Cup, playing all the matches and minutes in Colombia. He made his debut for the under-21s on 5 September 2011, coming on as a substitute for João Pereira in the 62nd minute of a 1–0 friendly victory over France.

== Career statistics ==
As of match played 28 April 2024

Appearances and goals by club, season and competition
Club	Season	League			Cup		League Cup		Continental		Total	
Club	Season	Division	Apps	Goals	Apps	Goals	Apps	Goals	Apps	Goals	Apps	Goals
Sporting CP B	2013–14	LigaPro	23	0	–		–		–		23	0
Sporting CP B	2014–15	LigaPro	31	1	–		–		–		31	1
Sporting CP B	Total		54	1	0	0	0	0	0	0	54	1
Cercle Brugge	2014–15	First Division A	12	0	0	0	–		–		12	0
Metz	2015–16	Ligue 2	27	0	2	0	–		–		29	0
Panathinaikos	2016–17	Super League Greece	21	0	8	1	–		0	0	29	1
Panathinaikos	2017–18	Super League Greece	4	0	2	0	–		2	0	8	0
Panathinaikos	Total		25	0	10	1	0	0	2	0	37	1
Vitória Setúbal	2017–18	Primeira Liga	12	0	0	0	0	0	–		12	0
Vitória Setúbal	2018–19	Primeira Liga	3	0	0	0	0	0	–		3	0
Vitória Setúbal	Total		15	0	0	0	0	0	0	0	15	0
Levski Sofia	2018–19	First League	25	1	2	0	–		0	0	27	1
Levski Sofia	2019–20	First League	19	0	2	0	–		4	0	25	0
Levski Sofia	Total		44	1	4	0	0	0	4	0	52	1
Melbourne City	2020–21	A-League	20	0	–		–		–		20	0
Melbourne City	2021–22	A-League	22	0	3	0	–		4	0	29	0
Melbourne City	2022–23	A-League	21	0	2	0	–		–		23	0
Melbourne City	2023–24	A-League	15	1	3	0	–		4	0	22	1
Melbourne City	Total		78	1	8	0	0	0	8	0	94	1
Career total			255	3	24	1	0	0	14	0	293	4

== Honours ==
Melbourne City

- A-League Premiership: 2020–21, 2021–22, 2022–23
- A-League Championship: 2020–21

Portugal

- FIFA U-20 World Cup runner-up: 2011

Orders

- Knight of the Order of Prince Henry
