= Alessandro Lopane =

Australian soccer player

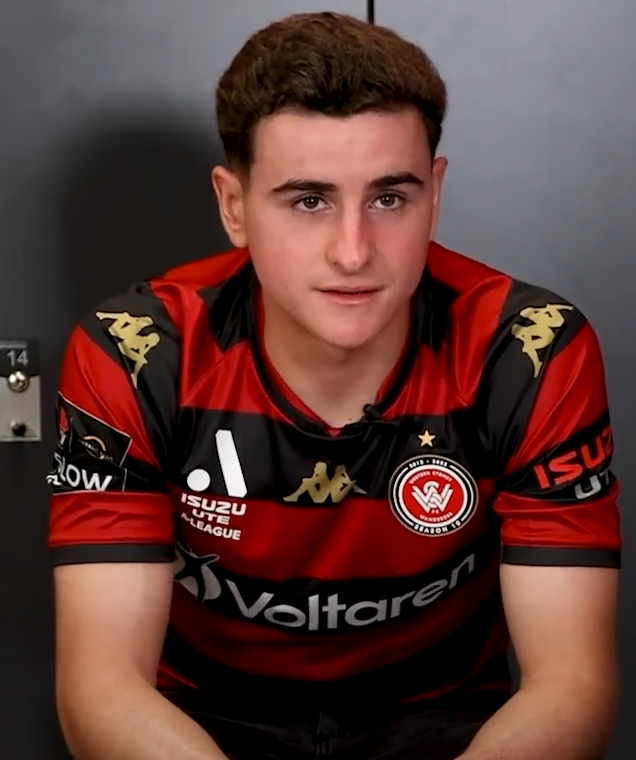
- Lopane with Western Sydney Wanderers in 2022

Personal information
- Full name: Alessandro Lopane
- Date of birth: 9 April 2004 (age 22)
- Place of birth: Sydney, Australia
- Height: 1.70 m (5 ft 7 in)
- Position: Attacking midfielder

Team information
- Current team: Melbourne City
- Number: 21

Youth career
- APIA Leichhardt
- Sydney Olympic
- 2016–2023: Western Sydney Wanderers

Senior career*
| Years | Team | Apps | (Gls) |
| 2020–2023 | Western Sydney Wanderers NPL | 44 | (10) |
| 2021–2023 | Western Sydney Wanderers | 19 | (0) |
| 2023– | Melbourne City | 41 | (2) |

International career^{‡}
| 2019 | Australia U16 | 7 | (0) |
| 2022 | Australia U20 | 2 | (0) |
| 2021– | Australia U23 | 3 | (0) |
- * Club domestic league appearances and goals as of 31 May 2025 ‡ National team caps and goals as of 5 June 2025

Alessandro Lopane (Italian: [a.lesˈsan.dro loˈpa.ne]; born 9 April 2004) is an Australian professional soccer player who plays as an attacking midfielder for Melbourne City.

== Club career ==
=== Melbourne City ===
On 23, June, 2023 Melbourne City announced the singing of Lopane on a two-year deal with the option to extend for one more year. He was announced alongside Patrick Beach and Zane Schreiber.

== Career statistics ==
As of match played on 31 May 2025

Appearances and goals by club, season and competition
| Club | Season | League | | | National Cup | | Continental | | Other | | Total | |
| Club | Season | Division | Apps | Goals | Apps | Goals | Apps | Goals | Apps | Goals | Apps | Goals |
|---|---|---|---|---|---|---|---|---|---|---|---|---|
| Western Sydney Wanderers | 2021–22 | A-League Men | 12 | 0 | 0 | 0 | — | | — | | 12 | 0 |
| Western Sydney Wanderers | 2022–23 | A-League Men | 7 | 0 | 0 | 0 | — | | — | | 7 | 0 |
| Western Sydney Wanderers | Total | | 19 | 0 | 0 | 0 | — | | — | | 19 | 0 |
| Western Sydney Wanderers Youth | 2023 | National Premier Leagues NSW | 13 | 1 | — | | — | | — | | 13 | 1 |
| Melbourne City | 2023–24 | A-League Men | 25 | 1 | 3 | 1 | 5 (Note: Appearances in the AFC Champions League) | 1 | — | | 33 | 3 |
| Melbourne City | 2024–25 | A-League Men | 9 | 1 | 1 | 0 | — | | — | | 10 | 1 |
| Melbourne City | Total | | 34 | 2 | 4 | 1 | 5 | 1 | — | | 43 | 4 |
| Career totals | | | 66 | 3 | 4 | 1 | 5 | 1 | 0 | 0 | 75 | 5 |
