= Raphael Borges Rodrigues =

Australian soccer player (born 2003)

Personal information
- Full name: Raphael Borges Rodrigues
- Date of birth: 11 September 2003 (age 23)
- Place of birth: Maastricht, Netherlands
- Height: 1.73 m (5 ft 8 in)
- Position: Winger

Team information
- Current team: Burton Albion (on loan from Coventry City)
- Number: 17

Youth career
- Western Strikers
- 2015: Adelaide Raiders
- 2015–2017: SA NTC
- 2018–2019: Melbourne City

Senior career*
Years	Team	Apps	(Gls)
2019–2023	Melbourne City NPL	24	(16)
2020–2023	Melbourne City	12	(1)
2023–2024	Macarthur	26	(4)
2024–	Coventry City	5	(0)
2025–2026	→ Wigan Athletic (loan)	37	(1)
2026–	→ Burton Albion (loan)	0	(0)

International career^{‡}
2022–	Australia U20	5	(1)
2023–	Australia U23	1	(0)
- * Club domestic league appearances and goals as of 4 September 2026 ‡ National team caps and goals as of 28 September 2022

Raphael Borges Rodrigues (born 11 September 2003) is a professional soccer player who plays as a winger for EFL League One side Burton Albion, on loan from Premier League club Coventry City. Born in the Netherlands, he represents Australia at youth international level.

== Early life ==
Raphael was born in Maastricht, Netherlands to Cristiano dos Santos Rodrigues, a former professional footballer. He moved to Adelaide, South Australia, with his family at the age of eight, while his extended family remained in his father's hometown, Rio de Janeiro, Brazil. Raphael attended St Michael's College in Henley Beach, South Australia and Parade College in Bundoora, Victoria. He started playing football in Adelaide for Western Strikers before moving to Melbourne.

== Club career ==
=== Melbourne City ===
Raphael joined Melbourne City Youth in 2017 and signed a three-year scholarship contract in September 2019. He re-signed for a season in October 2021, with an option to extend, after making five senior appearances since his first-team debut in the 2019–20 season, aged 16. Raphael made his first start for Melbourne City in the Melbourne Derby on 6 June 2021. He was named on the bench in the 2021 A-League Grand Final, being a part of City's first A-League trophy.

On 23 March 2022, Raphael scored his first professional goal in a 2–1 win over Brisbane Roar at Moreton Daily Stadium. Raphael was released by the club in June 2023.

=== Macarthur ===
On 27 June 2023, Raphael was announced to have signed for Macarthur on a two-year contract. In the 2023–24 season, Raphael managed three goals and two assists for the Bulls by February 2024. He finished the campaign for Macarthur with six goals in 33 appearances across all competitions.

=== Coventry City ===
On 24 May 2024, Raphael was announced to have signed with EFL Championship club Coventry City. He signed a four-year deal with the West Midlands club, expiring in June 2028.

==== Loan to Wigan Athletic ====
On 1 September 2025, Raphael joined Wigan Athletic on a season-long loan for the 2025–26 season.

==== Loan to Burton Albion ====
In September 2026, Raphael joined EFL League One side Burton Albion on a season-long loan.

== Career statistics ==
=== Club ===
As of 21 August 2026

Appearances and goals by club, season and competition
Club	Season	League			National cup (Note: Includes Australia Cup, FA Cup)		League cup (Note: Includes EFL Cup)		Continental		Other		Total	
Club	Season	Division	Apps	Goals	Apps	Goals	Apps	Goals	Apps	Goals	Apps	Goals	Apps	Goals
Melbourne City NPL	2019	NPL Victoria 2	5	2	—		—		—		—		5	2
Melbourne City NPL	2021	NPL Victoria 3	9	5	—		—		—		—		9	5
Melbourne City NPL	2022	NPL Victoria 3	5	2	—		—		—		—		5	2
Melbourne City NPL	2023	NPL Victoria 2	5	7	—		—		—		—		5	7
Melbourne City NPL	Total		24	16	0	0	0	0	0	0	0	0	24	16
Melbourne City	2019–20	A-League	1	0	0	0	—		—		—		1	0
Melbourne City	2020–21	A-League	4	0	—		—		—		—		4	0
Melbourne City	2021–22	A-League Men	5	1	2	0	—		3 (Note: Appearances in AFC Champions League)	1	—		10	2
Melbourne City	2022–23	A-League Men	2	0	0	0	—		—		—		2	0
Melbourne City	Total		12	1	2	0	0	0	3	1	0	0	17	2
Macarthur	2023–24	A-League Men	26	4	2	0	—		7 (Note: Appearances in AFC Cup)	2	—		35	6
Coventry City	2024–25	Championship	3	0	1	0	0	0	—		0	0	4	0
Coventry City	2025–26	Championship	2	0	—		2	0	—		—		4	0
Coventry City	2026–27	Premier League	0	0	0	0	0	0	—		—		0	0
Coventry City	Total		5	0	1	0	2	0	—		—		8	0
Wigan Athletic (loan)	2025–26	League One	37	1	4	0	1	0	—		1 (Note: Appearance in EFL Trophy)	0	43	1
Burton Albion (loan)	2026–27	League One	0	0	0	0	0	0	—		0	0	0	0
Career total			104	22	9	0	3	0	10	3	1	0	127	25

== Honours ==
Melbourne City

- A-League Men Championship: 2020–21
- A-League Men Premiership: 2020–21, 2021–22, 2022–23
