= 2020 National Premier Leagues Victoria =

7th season of the National Premier Leagues Victoria

National Premier Leagues Victoria
- Season: 2020
- Dates: 13 February – 15 March 2020
- Matches: 35
- Goals: 103 (2.94 per match)
- Top goalscorer: Brandon Barnes & Hamish Watson (5 goals)
- Biggest home win: Oakleigh Cannons 5–0 Altona Magic (6 March 2020); Avondale 6–1 Melbourne Knights (14 March 2020)
- Highest scoring: South Melbourne 5–2 Eastern Lions (23 February 2020)

The 2020 National Premier Leagues Victoria was the seventh season of the National Premier Leagues Victoria, the top league in Victorian football. Bentleigh Greens are the defending champions, having won their third championship title the previous season. The season started on 13 February and was cancelled on 18 March, due to the impacts from the COVID-19 pandemic in Australia.

== Teams ==
Fourteen teams compete in the league – the top twelve teams from the two teams promoted from the NPL Victoria 2. The promoted teams were Eastern Lions from the Eastern conference and St Albans Saints from the Western conference. They replaced Kingston City and Pascoe Vale.

=== Stadiums and locations ===
Note: Table lists in alphabetical order.

| Team | Suburb | Stadium | Capacity |
|---|---|---|---|
| Altona Magic | Altona North | Paisley Park Soccer Complex | 5,000 |
| Avondale | Avondale Heights | City Vista Recreation Reserve | 4,000 |
| Bentleigh Greens | Cheltenham | Kingston Heath Soccer Complex | 3,300 |
| Dandenong City | Endeavour Hills | Frank Holohan Soccer Complex | 4,000 |
| Dandenong Thunder | Danedenong | George Andrews Reserve | 5,000 |
| Eastern Lions | Burwood | George Andrews Reserve | 5,000 |
| Green Gully | St Albans | Green Gully Reserve | 10,000 |

== League table ==
| Pos | Team | Pld | W | D | L | GF | GA | GD | Pts |
|---|---|---|---|---|---|---|---|---|---|
| 1 | Hume City | 5 | 5 | 0 | 0 | 11 | 3 | +8 | 15 |
| 2 | Oakleigh Cannons | 5 | 3 | 1 | 1 | 11 | 6 | +5 | 10 |
| 3 | Dandenong Thunder | 5 | 3 | 1 | 1 | 9 | 7 | +2 | 10 |
| 4 | Avondale | 5 | 4 | 0 | 1 | 14 | 4 | +10 | 9 |
| 5 | Heidelberg United | 5 | 3 | 0 | 2 | 10 | 6 | +4 | 9 |
| 6 | Port Melbourne | 5 | 2 | 3 | 0 | 8 | 4 | +4 | 9 |
| 7 | St Albans Saints | 5 | 2 | 3 | 0 | 7 | 3 | +4 | 9 |
| 8 | South Melbourne | 5 | 1 | 3 | 1 | 7 | 7 | 0 | 6 |
| 9 | Green Gully | 5 | 2 | 0 | 3 | 7 | 9 | −2 | 6 |
| 10 | Bentleigh Greens | 5 | 1 | 2 | 2 | 4 | 3 | +1 | 5 |
| 11 | Melbourne Knights | 5 | 0 | 2 | 3 | 7 | 16 | −9 | 2 |
| 12 | Dandenong City | 5 | 0 | 1 | 4 | 4 | 10 | −6 | 1 |
| 13 | Eastern Lions | 5 | 0 | 1 | 4 | 2 | 12 | −10 | 1 |
| 14 | Altona Magic | 5 | 0 | 1 | 4 | 2 | 13 | −11 | 1 |

Source: SportsTG
Rules for classification: 1) Points; 2) Goal difference; 3) Goals scored

== Results ==
| Home \ Away | ALT | AVO | BEN | DCY | DTH | EAS | GRE | HEI | HUM | MBK | OAK | PMS | SAS | SOU |
|---|---|---|---|---|---|---|---|---|---|---|---|---|---|---|
| Altona Magic | — | 0–2 | | | | | | | | | | | | 1–1 |
| Avondale | | — | | | | | | | | 6–1 | | | | |
| Bentleigh Greens | | | — | | | | | | | | | | 0–0 | |
| Dandenong City | | 0–3 | | — | | | | 0–1 | | | | | 1–1 | |
| Dandenong Thunder | | | 1–0 | 3–2 | — | | | | | | | 1–2 | | |
| Eastern Lions | | | 0–3 | | 0–1 | — | | | | | | | | |
| Green Gully | 0–2 | | | | | | — | 2–1 | 0–1 | | | | | |
| Heidelberg United | 3–1 | | | | | | | — | | | | | | |
| Hume City | 2–0 | | 1–0 | 2–1 | | | | | — | | | | | |
| Melbourne Knights | | | | | 3–3 | | | | 2–4 | — | | | | |
| Oakleigh Cannons | 5–0 | 3–1 | | | | | 0–3 | 3–2 | | | — | | | 0–0 |
| Port Melbourne | | | | | | 3–0 | | | | 1–1 | | — | | 1–1 |
| St Albans Saints | | | | | | 0–0 | 4–2 | | | 2–0 | | | — | |
| South Melbourne | | | | | | 5–2 | | 0–3 | | | | | | — |

Source: SportsTG
Legend: Blue = home team win; Yellow = draw; Red = away team win.

== Season statistics ==
=== Scoring ===
==== Top scorers ====
| Rank | Player | Club | Goals |
|---|---|---|---|
| 1 | (Australia) Brandon Barnes | Dandenong Thunder | 5 |
| 1 | (New Zealand) Hamish Watson | Melbourne Knights | 5 |
| 3 | (England) Alex Salmon | Green Gully | 4 |
| 3 | (Australia) Stefan Valentini | Avondale | 4 |
| 5 | (Australia) Joe Guest | Oakleigh Cannons | 3 |
| 5 | (Australia) Joe Knowles | Oakleigh Cannons | 3 |
| 5 | (Australia) Steven Hewitt | Hume City | 3 |
| 5 | (Australia) Yuta Konagaya | Port Melbourne | 3 |
| 5 | (Australia) Harry Sawyer | South Melbourne | 3 |
| 5 | (Australia) Francesco Stella | Port Melbourne | 3 |

==== Hat-tricks ====
| Player | For | Against | Result | Date |
|---|---|---|---|---|
| (Australia) Harry Sawyer | South Melbourne | Eastern Lions | 5–2 (H) | 23 February 2020 |
