= Aiden O'Neill =

Australian soccer player (born 1998)

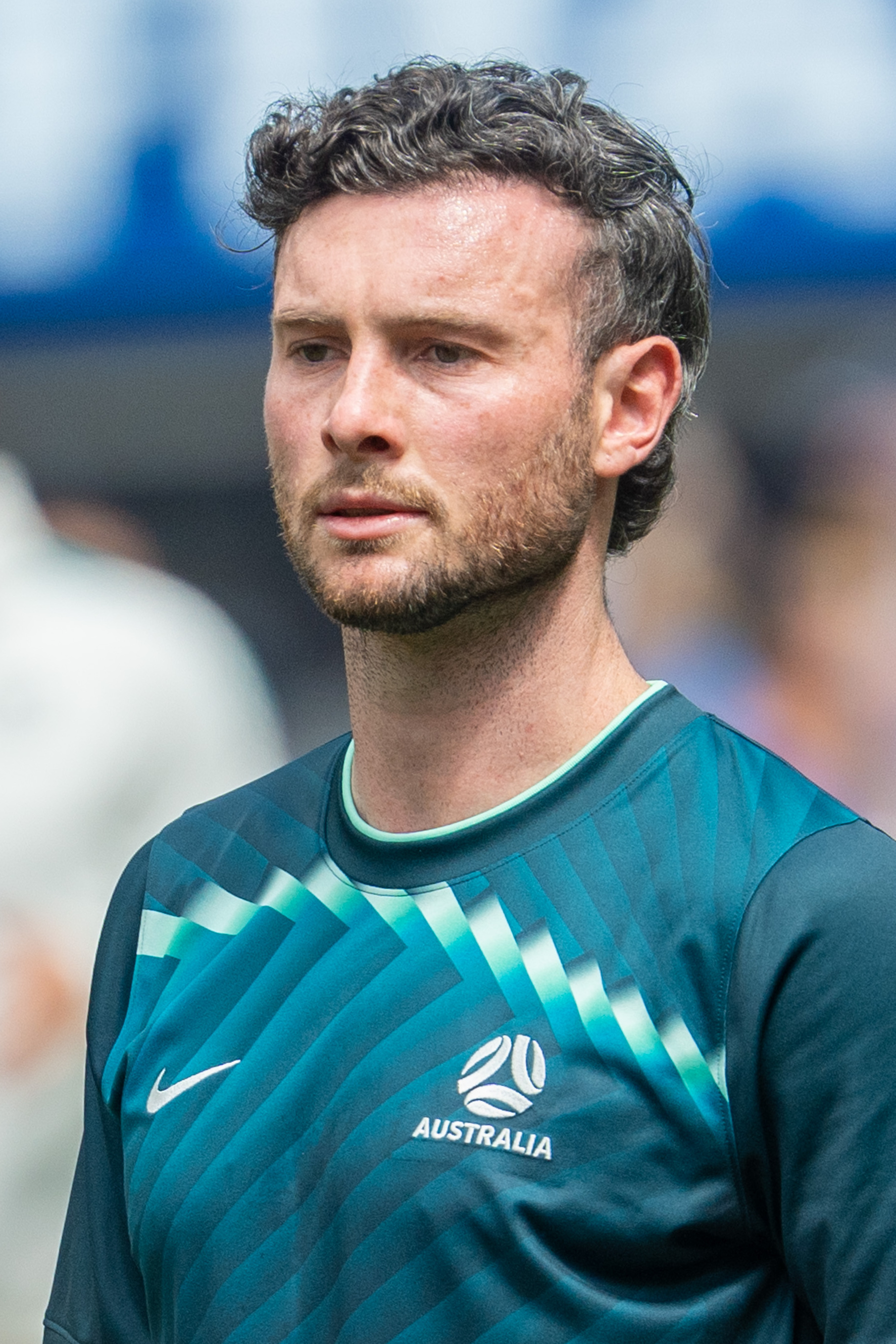
- O'Neill with Australia in 2026

Personal information
- Full name: Aiden Connor O'Neill
- Date of birth: 4 July 1998 (age 28)
- Place of birth: Brisbane, Australia
- Height: 1.78 m (5 ft 10 in)
- Position: Defensive midfielder

Team information
- Current team: New York City FC
- Number: 21

Youth career
- 2004–2006: Kenmore
- 2007–2011: Brisbane Athletic
- 2014–2016: Burnley

Senior career*
Years	Team	Apps	(Gls)
2016–2020	Burnley	3	(0)
2017	→ Oldham Athletic (loan)	15	(0)
2017–2018	→ Fleetwood Town (loan)	21	(1)
2018–2019	→ Central Coast Mariners (loan)	23	(4)
2019–2020	→ Brisbane Roar (loan)	17	(0)
2020–2023	Melbourne City	62	(4)
2023–2025	Standard Liège	50	(1)
2025–	New York City FC	25	(0)

International career^{‡}
2017–2021	Australia U23	9	(1)
2023–	Australia	35	(0)
Medal record
Men's football
Representing Australia
AFC U-23 Asian Cup
Third place	2020 Thailand	U-23 Team
- * Club domestic league appearances and goals as of 10 June 2025 ‡ National team caps and goals as of 3 July 2026

Aiden Connor O'Neill (born 4 July 1998) is an Australian professional soccer player who currently plays as a defensive midfielder for New York City FC and the Australia national team.

Born in Brisbane, O'Neill played youth football for Kenmore F.C. (now called UQFC), then Brisbane Athletic and Burnley before making his professional debut for the latter in 2016. He spent some time on loan to Oldham Athletic and Fleetwood Town, scoring his first ever professional goal for the latter club. He returned to Australia, on loan, to play for Central Coast Mariners in 2018.

He previously represented the Australian under-23 national team.

== Early life ==
O'Neill was born and raised in Brisbane, attending Nudgee Junior College before moving to Brisbane Boys' College before moving to England aged fourteen when his parents moved there for work.

== Club career ==
O'Neill played youth football for Brisbane Athletic between 2008 and 2012. He moved to England as a teenager, where he sought to pursue a career in football.

On 12 January 2016, O'Neill signed his first professional contract with then-Championship side Burnley. He made his professional debut for the club on 20 August 2016, coming on as a late substitute against Liverpool in the Premier League as Burnley won 2–0. He made his full debut days later, starting in an extra time loss to Accrington Stanley in the EFL Cup.

In January 2017, he joined EFL League One strugglers Oldham Athletic on loan until the end of the season. He made a total of fifteen appearances for the Latics.

In August 2017, he joined League One side Fleetwood Town on a season-long loan deal. In January 2018, he returned to Burnley early having made twenty-seven appearances and scoring once against Blackburn Rovers.

In August 2018, O'Neill returned to Australia to play for Central Coast Mariners in the A-League on a season-long loan.

=== Melbourne City ===
O'Neill signed a three-year deal with Melbourne City in September 2020.

During the 2022–23 season O'Neill had become a key player in the starting 11, scoring a brace in a 2–1 victory against Brisbane Roar on 12 March 2023.

During the Melbourne Derby on 17 December 2022, O'Neill scored the opening goal during the match, that was later abandoned due to player safety in the 22nd minute. During the resumption of the match on 5 April 2023, O'Neill scored a second goal completing his brace. His brace became the longest time between both goals in a brace with his first and second goal being 156,956 minutes apart.

=== New York City FC ===
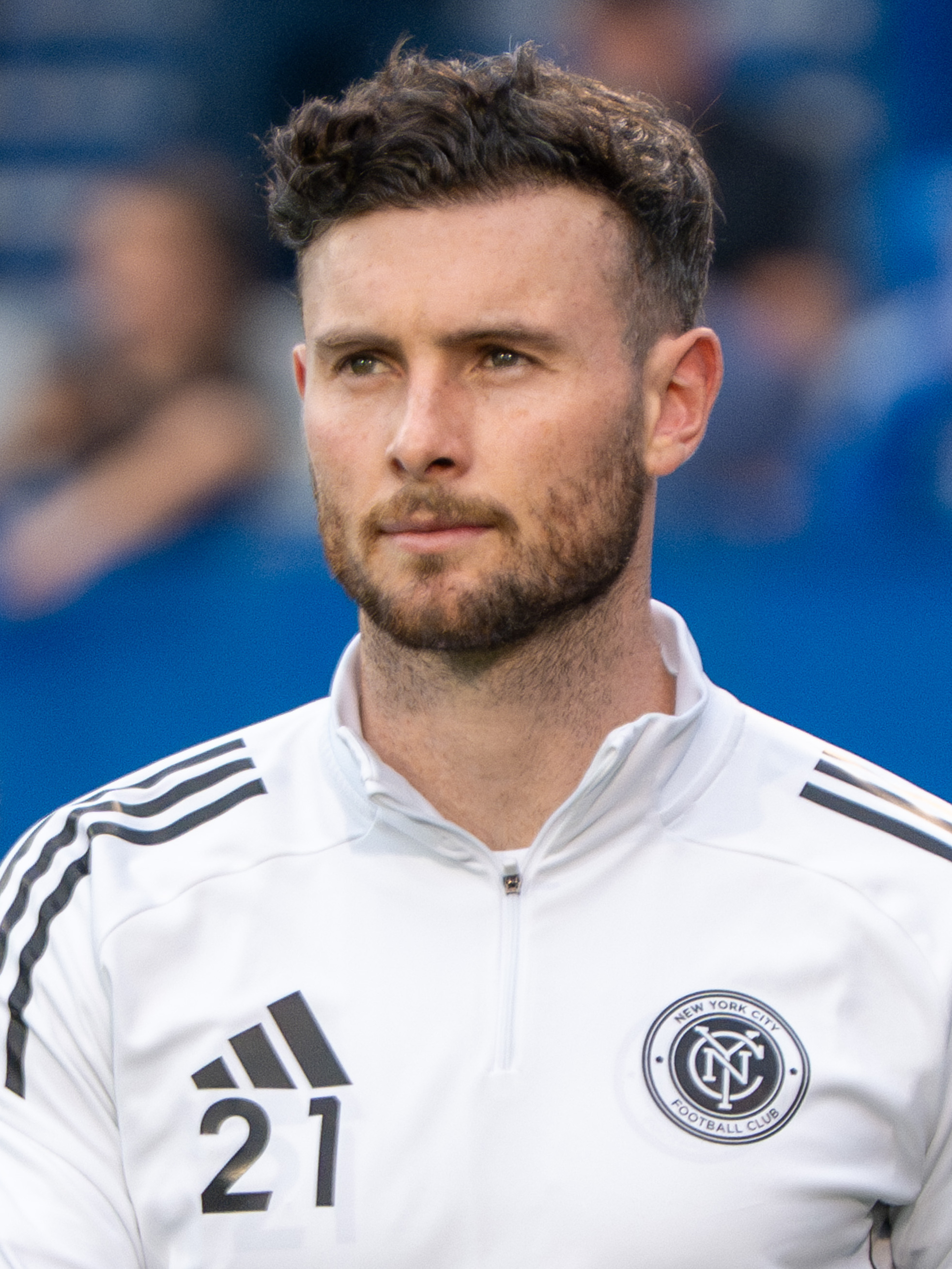
O'Neill with New York City FC in 2025

In April 2025, Aiden O’Neill transferred from Standard Liège to New York City FC, signing a contract that runs through the 2028 season. Sporting Director David Lee highlighted O’Neill’s leadership and familiarity with the City Football Group system as key assets, noting his role as a “smart and powerful midfielder with a high work rate.”

He made his MLS debut in the early part of the 2025 season, adding six appearances by June 2025. Seamlessly transitioning into NYCFC's midfield rotation, O’Neill brought international experience, having previously captained Standard Liège and earned numerous caps with the Australia national team.

== International career ==
O'Neill has stated that his preference is to play for Australia, but had not been in any contact with Football Federation Australia when he made his Premier League debut in August 2016. He was later called up for an Australia under-23 camp in March 2017. He had previously been contacted by the Football Association of Ireland and the Irish Football Association but reiterated that his preference was to play for Australia.

On 14 March 2023, O’Neill was called up to the Socceroos team for the first time with friendlies against Ecuador.

He made his senior debut in a 3–1 win over Ecuador on 24 March 2023.

On 3 February 2024, O'Neill received his first international red card against South Korea in extra-time at the quarter-finals of the 2023 AFC Asian Cup. The game would end in a 1–2 loss. He has since become a mainstay in the Socceroos squad, featuring prominently in Australia's third round of 2026 FIFA World Cup qualifiers.

On 31 May 2026, O’Neill was selected in the 26-man squad for the 2026 FIFA World Cup.

== Career statistics ==
=== Club ===
As of 2 November 2025

Appearances and goals by club, season and competition
Club	Season	League			National Cup		League Cup		Other		Total	
Club	Season	Division	Apps	Goals	Apps	Goals	Apps	Goals	Apps	Goals	Apps	Goals
Burnley	2016–17	Premier League	3	0	1	0	1	0	—		5	0
Burnley	2017–18	Premier League	0	0	—		—		—		0	0
Burnley	2018–19	Premier League	0	0	—		—		0	0	0	0
Burnley	Total		3	0	1	0	1	0	0	0	5	0
Oldham Athletic (loan)	2016–17	League One	15	0	—		—		—		15	0
Fleetwood Town (loan)	2017–18	League One	21	1	3	0	1	0	2 (Note: Appearances in EFL Trophy)	0	27	1
Central Coast Mariners (loan)	2018–19	A-League	23	4	0	0	—		—		23	4
Brisbane Roar (loan)	2019–20	A-League	17	0	1	0	—		—		18	0
Melbourne City	2020–21	A-League	14	0	—		—		—		14	0
Melbourne City	2021–22	A-League Men	21	0	2	0	—		0	0	23	0
Melbourne City	2022–23	A-League Men	27	4	0	0	—		—		27	4
Melbourne City	Total		138	9	6	0	1	0	2	0	147	9
Standard Liège	2023–24	Belgian Pro League	23	1	2	0	—		—		25	1
Standard Liège	2024–25	Belgian Pro League	25	0	2	1	—		2 (Note: Appearances in Belgian Pro League Europe Play-Offs)	0	29	1
Standard Liège	Total		48	1	4	1	0	0	2	0	54	2
New York City FC	2025	Major League Soccer	20	0	—		3	0	2	0	25	0
Career total			209	10	11	1	5	0	6	0	231	11

=== International ===
As of 3 July 2026

Appearances and goals by national team and year
National team	Year	Apps	Goals
Australia
Australia	2023	7	0
Australia	2024	10	0
Australia	2025	10	0
Australia	2026	8	0
Total		35	0

== Honours ==
Melbourne City

- A-League Premiership: 2020–21, 2021–22, 2022–23
- A-League Championship: 2020–21

Australia U23

- AFC U-23 Championship: 3rd place 2020

Individual

- PFA A-League Team of the Season: 2022–23

== See also ==
- List of foreign Premier League players
