= Kerrin Stokes =

Australian soccer player

Personal information
- Full name: Kerrin Stokes
- Date of birth: 11 December 2002 (age 23)
- Place of birth: Adelaide, Australia
- Height: 1.86 m (6 ft 1 in)
- Position: Central defender

Team information
- Current team: Adelaide City

Youth career
- FFSA NTC
- Croydon Kings

Senior career*
Years	Team	Apps	(Gls)
2018–2019	Croydon Kings	26	(1)
2019–2023	Melbourne City	7	(0)
2021–2023	Melbourne City NPL	29	(0)
2023–	Adelaide City	27	(0)

International career^{‡}
2018	Australia U-17	1	(0)
- * Club domestic league appearances and goals as of 9 September 2024 ‡ National team caps and goals as of 16 January 2021

Kerrin Stokes (born 11 December 2002) is an Australian soccer player who plays as a central defender for Adelaide City. He previously played in the A-League Men for Melbourne City. His father Phillip Stokes is a Horse racing trainer based in South Australia.

== Career statistics ==
=== Club ===
As of 30 August 2022

Appearances and goals by club, season and competition
Club	Season	League			National Cup		Asia		Other		Total	
Club	Season	Division	Apps	Goals	Apps	Goals	Apps	Goals	Apps	Goals	Apps	Goals
Croydon Kings	2018	NPL South Australia	5	0	—		—		—		5	0
Croydon Kings	2019	NPL South Australia	21	1	—		—		—		21	1
Croydon Kings	Total		26	1	—		—		—		26	1
Melbourne City	2020–21	A-League	4	0	—		—		—		4	0
Melbourne City NPL	2021	NPL Victoria 3	7	0	—		—		—		7	0
Melbourne City NPL	2022	NPL Victoria 3	10	0	—		—		—		10	0
Career total			47	1	—		—		—		47	1

=== International ===
As of match played 20 July 2017.

Appearances and goals by national team, year and competition
Team	Year	Competitive		Friendly		Total	
Team	Year	Apps	Goals	Apps	Goals	Apps	Goals
Australia U17	2018	1 (Note: Appearance in the 2018 AFC U-16 Championship)	0	0	0	1	0

== Honours ==
Melbourne City

- A-League Premiership: 2020–21, 2022–23
- A-League Championship: 2020–21
