= List of ambassadors of the United Arab Emirates to France =

UAE Ambassador to the France

Ambassador of United Arab Emirates to France
- Coat of Arms of the UAE
- Incumbent; Fahad Saeed Al Raqbani since September 18, 2024
- Ministry of Foreign Affairs
- Style: His Excellency
- Formation: 1971

The Emirati ambassador to France is the official representative of the Government in Abu Dhabi to the Government of the Republic of France and the Principality of Monaco.

== History ==
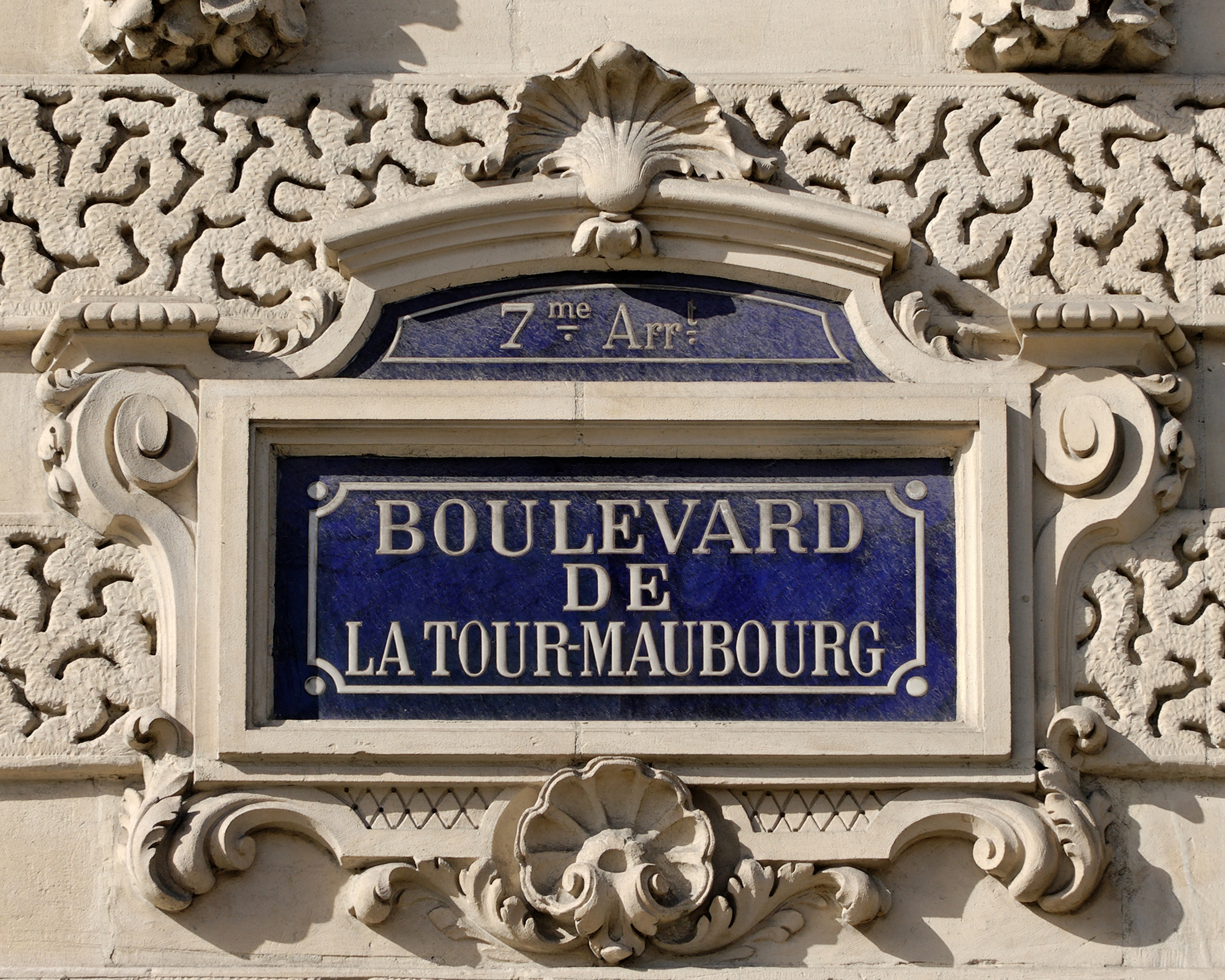
Boulevard de la Tour-Maubourg

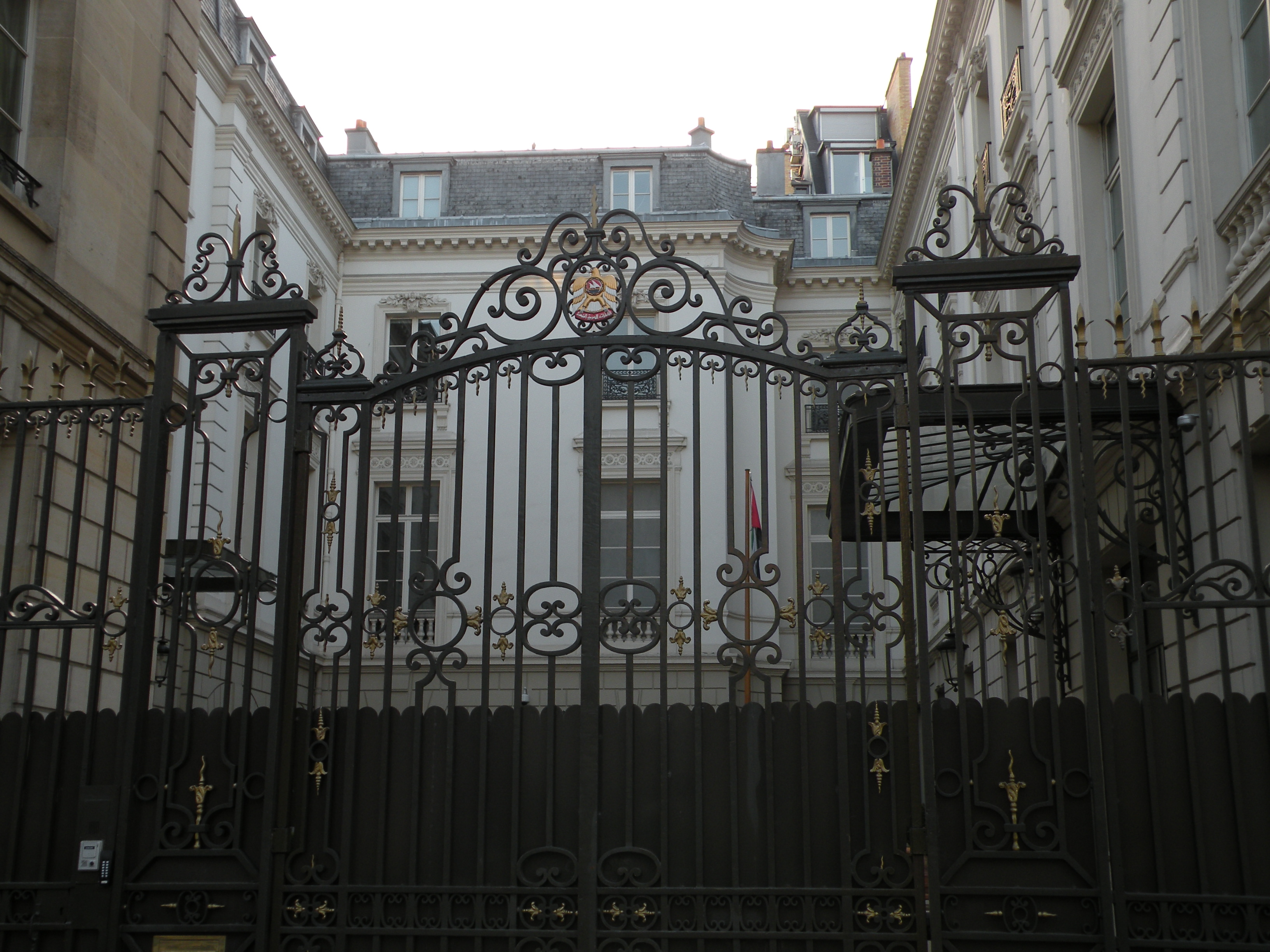
Emirati Embassy, Paris

The UAE Embassy in Paris was established on 14 February 1973. France's first Ambassador to the UAE was Paul Carton, then the French Ambassador to Kuwait. In February 1974, Paul Martin was appointed resident ambassador to Abu Dhabi with France opening its first embassy in the United Arab Emirates in 1974.

The UAE Embassy moved to its current site, 2 Boulevard de la Tour-Maubourg in the 7th arrondissement (formerly the headquarters of the Rally for the Republic party), in 2005. In 1995, France and the UAE signed a defense partnership agreement, which was first activated by France in 2022 after Iranian-aligned Houthis in Yemen carried out a drone attack on Abu Dhabi.

The Ambassador is also accredited to the Principality of Monaco as a non-resident Ambassador.

== List of representatives ==
Diplomatic accreditation	Ambassador	Emirati president	President of France	Term end	Observations
1971	Mahdi Al Tajir	Zayed bin Sultan Al Nahyan	Georges Pompidou (1971–1974); Alain Poher (1974–1974); Valéry Giscard d'Estaing (1974–1980)	1980	Concurrently served as UAE Ambassador to United Kingdom
1980	Khalifa Ahmad Mubarak	Zayed bin Sultan Al Nahyan	Valéry Giscard d'Estaing (1980–1984); François Mitterrand (1981–1984)	1984	Assassinated in front of his residence on Avenue Charles Floquet, Paris; father of Khaldoon Al Mubarak
1984	Ahmed Abdul Rahman Al-Jarman	Zayed bin Sultan Al Nahyan	François Mitterrand		Later served as Permanent Representative of the UAE to the United Nations
1995	Abdulaziz Nasser Al Shamsi	Zayed bin Sultan Al Nahyan	Jacques Chirac	1999	Previously UAE Ambassador to Brazil, Argentina, Switzerland
	Maadhad Hareb Al-Khaili	Khalifa bin Zayed Al Nahyan		2017	Later served as UAE Ambassador to Russia
2017	Omar Saif Ghobash	Khalifa bin Zayed Al Nahyan	Emmanuel Macron	2018	Son of Minister Saif Ghobash. Later served as UAE Ambassador to Russia
2019	Ali Abdullah Al-Ahmad	Khalifa bin Zayed Al Nahyan	Emmanuel Macron	2021	Later served as UAE Ambassador to Germany
2021	Hend Al Otaiba	Khalifa bin Zayed Al Nahyan	Emmanuel Macron	2024	Previously led the UAE Foreign Ministry's Strategic Communications Department
2024	Fahad Saeed Al Raqbani	Khalifa bin Zayed Al Nahyan	Emmanuel Macron	Incumbent	Previously the UAE Ambassador to Canada

== See also ==
- Foreign relations of France
- Foreign relations of the United Arab Emirates
