= Ghobash =

Ghobash is an Emirati surname.

== List of people with the surname ==
- Omar Saif Ghobash (born 1971), Emirati diplomat and author
- Saif Ghobash (1932–1977), Emirati diplomat and engineer
- Saqr Ghobash (born 1952), Emirati politician
