= Badr Jafar =

Emirati entrepreneur (born 1979)

- بدر جعفر
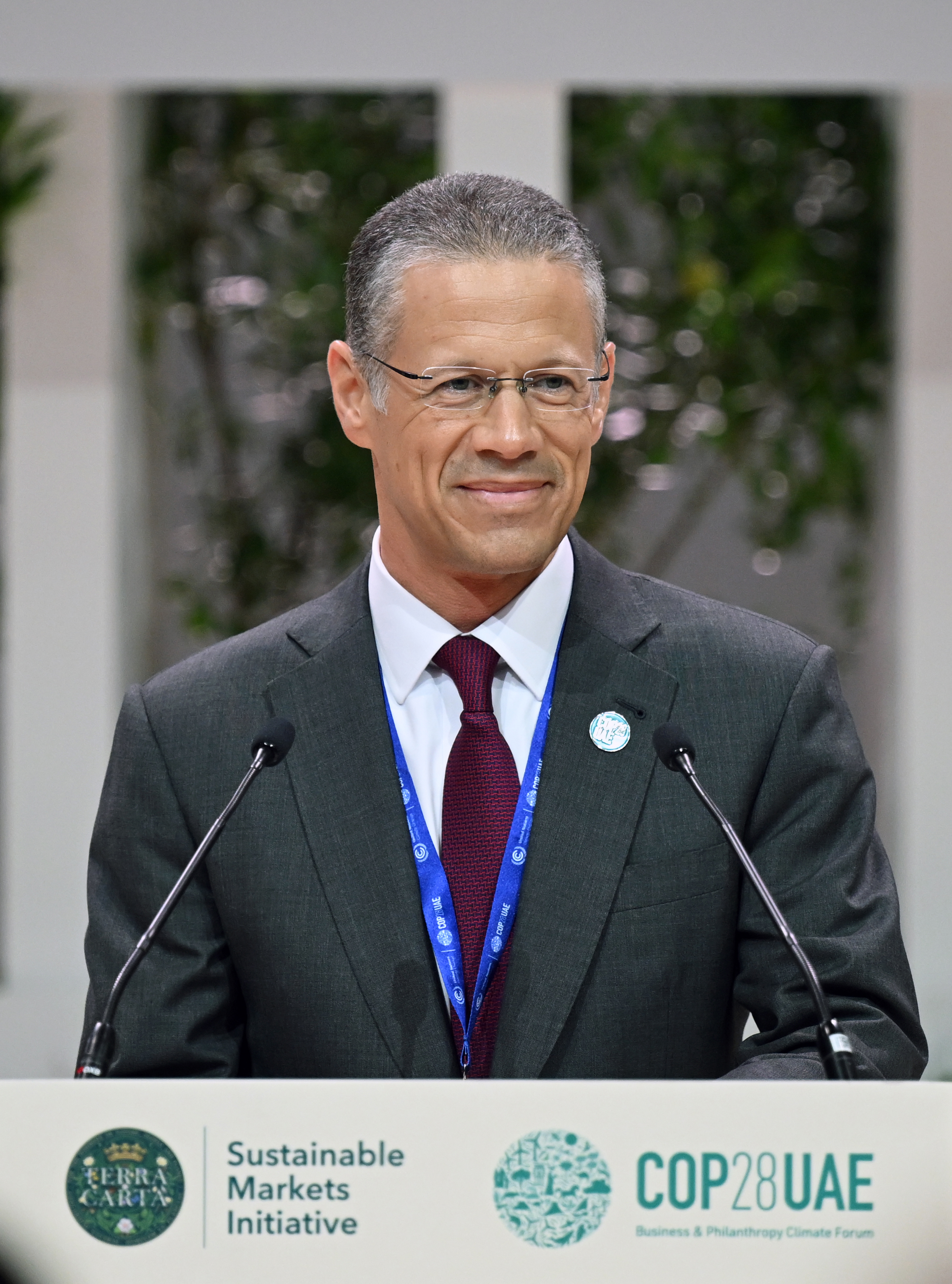
- Badr Jafar at COP28
- Born: August 9, 1979 (age 47); Sharjah, UAE
- Citizenship: Emirati
- Alma mater: Eton College; Cambridge University
- Spouse: Razan Khalifa Al Mubarak
- Relatives: Majid Jafar (brother)
- Website: badrjafar.com

Badr Jafar (Arabic: بدر حميد جعفر; born 1979) is an Emirati businessperson and Special Envoy for Business and Philanthropy for the United Arab Emirates. He is the chief executive officer of Crescent Enterprises, a UAE-based conglomerate.

== Early life and education ==
Badr Jafar was born and raised in Sharjah, United Arab Emirates. In 1994, he studied at Eton College and graduated from the University of Cambridge with a master’s degree in engineering. Jafar attended the Cambridge Judge Business School.

Jafar is a member of the advisory boards of the Cambridge Judge Business School, the American University of Beirut, the American University of Sharjah, and a member of the board of trustees of Zayed University. He is a foundation fellow of Eton College and holds an Honorary Fellowship from London Business School. He is the Founding Patron of the Centre for Strategic Philanthropy based at the University of Cambridge. In 2021, Jafar announced the launch of the Strategic Philanthropy Initiative at New York University Abu Dhabi.

== Career ==
He is the chief executive officer of Crescent Enterprises, a conglomerate headquartered in the United Arab Emirates. He is the president of Crescent Enterprises’ sister company Crescent Petroleum, chairman of Pearl Petroleum, which develops natural gas assets in the Kurdistan Region of Iraq and chairman of the executive board of the port operator Gulftainer.

In 2015, he was appointed by the United Nations Secretary-General to the High-Level Panel on Humanitarian Financing, and was subsequently appointed to UNESCO’s Futures of Education International Commission that was established in 2019.

He was Special Representative for Business and Philanthropy at the 2023 United Nations Climate Change Conference (COP28). In May 2024, he was awarded the First Class Order of Zayed II by UAE President Sheikh Mohamed bin Zayed Al Nahyan. In September 2024, he was appointed as a Special Envoy for Business and Philanthropy for the UAE by Sheikh Abdullah bin Zayed Al Nahyan, Deputy Prime Minister and Minister of Foreign Affairs.

== Other activities ==
In 2025, Jafar was recognized by Time on the inaugural Time 100 Philanthropy list. In 2018, Jafar and his wife joined The Giving Pledge, a philanthropic initiative launched by Bill Gates, Melinda Gates, and Warren Buffett. Jafar is the founder of the non-profit Pearl Initiative and chairman of the non-profit Endeavor UAE. In 2011, Jafar was named a Young Global Leader by the World Economic Forum and is a member of its stewardship board. He is on the advisory board of the Sharjah Entrepreneurship Centre (Sheraa) and Gaza Sky Geeks. In 2011, Jafar launched the Middle East Theatre Academy (META). He is on the board of advisors of the International Rescue Committee (IRC), and the Milken Institute for strategic philanthropy, the Middle East Institute, and the board of directors of the International Peace Institute.

In 2011, he partnered with music producer Quincy Jones to create Global Gumbo Group to develop music and arts ventures in the Middle East. The group launched Dubai Music Week in 2013. They produced a charity single titled Tomorrow/Bokra (Arabic: بكرا) to raise funds for educational arts projects for displaced youth in the Middle East.

== Personal life ==
He is married to Razan Khalifa Al Mubarak, the managing director of the Environment Agency Abu Dhabi and the current president of the International Union for Conservation of Nature (IUCN). They have two children.
