= ICBA =

ICBA may refer to:

- Independent Community Bankers of America, a U.S. trade association
- International Center for Biosaline Agriculture, a United Arab Emirates research organization
- International Cooperative Banking Association, sectoral International Cooperative Alliance organisation
