= Bahrain: Shouting in the Dark =

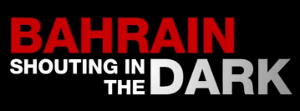
- Genre: Participatory documentary film
- Written by: May Ying Welsh
- Directed by: May Ying Welsh
- Country of origin: Bahrain
- Original language: English

Production
- Producer: Jon Blair
- Editor: Tuki Laumea
- Running time: 51 minutes (1 hour slot, including 2 quick bulletin rundowns and fillers before, during and after)

Original release
- Network: Al Jazeera English
- Release: 4 August 2011

Related
- Bahrain: Fighting for change Bahrain: Audacity of hope

Bahrain: Shouting in the Dark is a television documentary film produced by Qatar-based news channel Al Jazeera English about the 2011 Bahraini uprising. The film was first screened on 4 August 2011, featuring footage recorded during protests and police crackdowns, interviews with activists and physicians, as well as footage broadcast by Bahraini state television.

== Production ==
Shouting in the Dark was written, directed and shot undercover in Bahrain by Al Jazeera journalist and filmmaker May Ying Welsh. It was edited by Al Jazeera's Tuki Laumea. Jon Blair is the executive producer.

Shouting in the Dark has been translated into 8 languages, including Arabic, French, Persian, Czech, Swedish, Finnish, Estonian, and Portuguese, by various national broadcasters and by fans.

== Reception ==
In the first four days, the documentary received almost 200,000 views on YouTube. Bahraini Foreign Minister Khalid Al Khalifah criticised Qatar on his official Twitter account after the airing of the film:

من الواضح ان في قطر هناك من لا يريد خير للبحرين .. و ما الفيلم المكيف في الجزيرة انجليزي الا خير مثال على العداء الغير مفهوم

It's clear that in Qatar there are those who don't want anything good for Bahrain. And this film on Al Jazeera English is the best example of this inexplicable hostility.

Rumours also spread online that Bahrain intended to sever relations with Qatar over the film; however this was denied by Bahrain's foreign ministry. The film was finally re-broadcast on 11 August and was followed by a discussion with the first deputy chairman of the Consultative Council of Bahrain Jamal Fakhro as the pro-government guest.

== Awards ==
Bahrain: Shouting in the Dark has won seven major journalism, film and television awards:

- The U.K. Foreign Press Association's Documentary of the Year award in November 2011.
- The 2011 63rd annual George Polk Award in Journalism for Television Documentary. Reporter May Ying Welsh and field producer Hassan Mahfood were also recognised for their courageous work.
- The Scripps Howard Jack R. Howard Award for Television Reporting. The judging committee called the film "a testament to the power of journalism."
- The Grand Prize at the 2012 Robert F. Kennedy Journalism Awards, as well as their award for international television. It was described by Ethel Kennedy as "a heartbreaking and jaw dropping work demanding attention."
- The Amnesty International Media Award for International Television and Radio.
- The Golden Nymph for the Best News Documentary at the 52nd Annual Monte Carlo TV Festival
- The Cine Golden Eagle Award for investigative news documentary.

Bahrain: Shouting in the Dark was also nominated for a BAFTA, and for a Royal Television Society Award.

== Other Al Jazeera films ==
Al Jazeera English has produced two additional films on Bahrain under the People & Power documentary strand: Bahrain: Fighting for Change, and its follow-up Bahrain: Audacity of Hope.
