= Roland Rich =

Australian diplomat

Roland Rich (born 2 May 1951) is a former Australian Ambassador and educator. He is currently the Director of the United Nations and Global Policy Master of Arts program at Rutgers University, where he has been an Associate Teaching Professor since 2015. He was also a senior United Nations official as the head of the United Nations Democracy Fund from 2007 to 2014, and as Officer-in-Charge of the United United Nations Office for Partnerships from 2010 to 2014.

Rich joined Australia's foreign service in 1975 and served in a variety of overseas posts, and served in a variety of overseas posts including Paris, Rangoon, Manila and as Ambassador to Laos from 1994 to 1997, before being appointed Assistant Secretary for International Organisations in Australia's Department of Foreign Affairs and Trade in 1997.

He was then founding Director of the Australian National University's Centre for Democratic Institutions from 1998 to 2005. He was a Reagan-Fascell Democracy Fellow at the National Endowment for Democracy in 2005, and then taught in the Centre for Defence and Strategic Studies of the Australian Defence College.

Rich has a Bachelor of Arts from the University of Sydney (1972) and a Bachelor of Laws from the University of Sydney. He also has a Masters in International Law form the Australian National University (1982). He also holds a PhD from the Australian National University.

== Books ==
- The United Nations as Leviathan: Global Governance in the Post-American World (2023, Rowman and Littlefield), Hamilton Books
- COVID-19 Under Democracy and Autocracy, (2021, ed.), Rutgers
- Democracy in Crisis: Why, Where, How to Respond, (2017), Lynne Rienner Publishers
- Parties and Parliaments in Southeast Asia – Non-Partisan Chambers in Indonesia, Thailand and the Philippines (2012), Routledge
- Pacific Asia in Quest of Democracy (2007), Lynne Rienner Publishers
- Political Parties in the Pacific Islands (2006, ed with Hambly, L & Morgan, M), Pandanus Books, Canberra.
- The UN Role in Promoting Democracy (2004, with Edward Newman), United Nations University Press

== Selected papers ==
- Designing the DPD: Indonesia's Regional Representative Council, Bulletin of Indonesian Economic Studies, vol. 47, issue 2
- Situating the UN Democracy Fund” Global Governance (2010, Vol. 16, No. 4)
- Applying Conditionality to Development Assistance, Agenda – A Journal of Policy Analysis and Reform, (2004, November issue)
- Bringing Democracy into International Law, Journal of Democracy, (July, 2001, Vol. 12, No. 3)
- Recognition of States: the Collapse of Yugoslavia and the Soviet Union”, European Journal of International Law (March, 1992, Vol. 4, No. 1)

Diplomatic posts
Preceded by M.D. Mann	Australian Ambassador to Laos; 1994 – 1997	Succeeded by Karina Campbell
