= Khaldoon Al Mubarak =

Emirati investment manager

Khaldoon Khalifa Al Mubarak
- خلدون المبارك
- Al Mubarak in 2025 at the White House
- Born: Khaldoon Khalifa Al Mubarak; 27 January 1976 (age 50); Abu Dhabi, United Arab Emirates
- Education: Tufts University
- Occupations: CEO and managing director of Mubadala Investment Company; Member of Abu Dhabi Executive Council; Chairman of Manchester City and Melbourne City; Founding chairman of City Football Group
- Relatives: Razan Al Mubarak (sister)
- Awards: Commander of the Star of the Order of the Italian Solidarity; Commander of the Order of the British Empire; Grand Gwanghwa Medal of the Order of Diplomatic Service Merit

Khaldoon Khalifa Al Mubarak (Arabic: خلدون المبارك; born 27 January 1976) is an Emirati government official and business leader. Al Mubarak holds senior positions within the Government of Abu Dhabi, including as a member of the Executive Council since 2006, a member of the Supreme Council for Financial and Economic Affairs, and as the founding chairman of the Executive Affairs Authority. He fulfills responsibilities for the UAE Federal government and has served as Presidential Special Envoy to the People's Republic of China since 2018.

Al Mubarak is chief executive officer and managing director of Mubadala Investment Company. He is chairman of the football clubs Manchester City, Melbourne City and founding chairman of City Football Group. In September 2026, under his leadership, Manchester City were found guilty of 114 charges relating to financial misreporting, creating "sham contracts" and non-cooperation with Premier League investigators in one of the biggest scandals in sport history. Manchester city have begun an appeal against the verdict of the independent panel that found them guilty. Al Mubarak is on the board of the UAE business ADNOC and serves as the Chairman of the Boards of the Emirates Nuclear Energy Corporation, Abu Dhabi Commercial Bank and Emirates Global Aluminium.

== Early life ==
Al Mubarak was born on 27 January 1976 in Abu Dhabi, United Arab Emirates. He is from a family of diplomats, and religious and judicial scholars. Khaldoon's father was the former UAE diplomat and ambassador to France, Khalifa Ahmad Mubarak, who was assassinated in Paris in 1984. Khaldoon's grandfather was Al Sheikh Ahmed Abdulaziz Hamad Al-Mubarak, former Judge and Chairman of the Shari'a Judicial Department in the Emirate of Abu Dhabi, he was appointed by founder of the UAE and ruler of Abu Dhabi, Sheikh Zayed bin Sultan Al Nahyan. His great-grandfather Professor (Al Sheikh) Abdulaziz Hamad Al-Mubarak, a judicial scholar, played a significant role to the UAE educational system, where he established the country's first school in the Emirate of Dubai; he was an advisor to Sheikh Zayed bin Khalifa Al Nahyan.

Khaldoon has three siblings, two of whom are senior government officials: Rasha; Razan Khalifa Al Mubarak, managing director and board member of the Environment Agency Abu Dhabi and the managing director for the Mohamed bin Zayed Species Conservation Fund; and Mohamed Khalifa Al Mubarak, Chairman of Department of Culture and Tourism Abu Dhabi and member of the Executive Council of the Emirate of Abu Dhabi, and Chairman of Aldar Properties PJSC.

Khaldoon attended the American Community School of Abu Dhabi. In 1997, he obtained a degree in Economics and Finance from Tufts University.

== Career ==
Al Mubarak has worked for the state-owned Abu Dhabi National Oil Company, and the UAE Offsets Group. He was executive vice-president-corporate of Dolphin Energy.

Al Mubarak has interests in mining projects in South America, specifically in Colombia, as he directs the state-owned Mubadala Investment Group, the company that owns Minesa, a company created in 2013 to obtain the exploitation license, from the Colombian government, to extract gold from the Páramo de Santurbán, Soto Norte province, Santander department, with reserves calculated in the subsoil of approximately 9 million ounces. There has been fierce opposition from environmentalists and political leaders in the region due to the threat posed by the contamination of the water reserve that nourishes more than 4 million inhabitants, a product of possible mismanagement that Minesa gives to the cyanide and mercury residues necessary to extract the gold as well as the destruction of the páramo ecosystem, becoming even a matter of national and international interest. However, the investment made in the country during the 2010s, seeking the favor of the government and productive sectors of the country in favor of the exploitation of the páramo, is being put at risk as Minesa's request is filed by the National Environmental Licensing Authority (ANLA), declaring deficient the Environmental Impact Study in the area made by the mining company. After an appeal process by Minesa, the ANLA ordered in January 2021 the final file of the environmental license for the mining megaproject.

Al Mubarak was appointed CEO and managing director of the government-owned investment company Mubadala Development. In 2017, he was appointed managing director and chief executive officer of the Mubadala Investment Company, after Mubadala Development merged with International Petroleum Investment Company (IPIC). In March 2020, Mubadala Investment Company was managing a $230 billion portfolio. The company owns stakes in numerous companies, including a 5 percent share in Ferrari, an 8.1 percent share in AMD, and a 7.5 percent share in the Carlyle Group. In May 2005, he was appointed vice-chairman of Oasis International Leasing, an Abu Dhabi-based leasing company. Through Mubadala Investment Company, Al Mubarak is vice-chairman of Piaggio Aero, and vice-chairman of LeasePlan. During Al Mubarak's tenure Mubadala invested into new markets, among them projects of Brazilian magnate Eike Batista.

He has been characterized as "one of the royal family's most trusted advisers" and having "a close relationship with His Highness the President Mohamed bin Zayed Al Nahyan." When the Abu Dhabi government was restructured in 2006, Al Mubarak became chairman of Executive Affairs Authority and a member of the Executive Council for the Emirate of Abu Dhabi. He is an Abu Dhabi Education Council member, a director of the Abu Dhabi Council for Economic Development (ABCED), and chairman of the Organization & Administration Department. Al Mubarak is co-chair of the United States Chamber of Commerce's US–U.A.E. Business Council, which was established in 2007, chairman of the Abu Dhabi Media Zone Authority, and vice-chairman of the Abu Dhabi Urban Planning Council which was established in 2007.

Al Mubarak is a board member of the Supreme Petroleum Council (SPC) of the Government of Abu Dhabi and the chairman of the Emirates Nuclear Energy Corporation (ENEC), Abu Dhabi Commercial Bank. He is co-chair of the Abu Dhabi-Singapore Joint Forum. Within the UAE, Mubarak is considered to be one of the key investors, and plays a major role in the economic diversity plan to move away from oil and put more focus into aerospace, manufacturing and utilities. He sits on boards including ALDAR Properties, the Emirates Foundation and the First Abu Dhabi Bank, which was formed by a merger of First Gulf Bank and National Bank of Abu Dhabi. He is the chairman of Emirates Global Aluminum (EGA), an aluminum conglomerate. Al Mubarak is chairman of the advisory board for the Global Manufacturing and Industrialisation Summit (GMIS), which is a joint initiative by the UAE Ministry of Economy and the United Nations Industrial Development Organization (UNIDO). In 2018, Al Mubarak was appointed as the first Presidential Special Envoy to China by UAE President Sheikh Khalifa bin Zayed. He is also the vice chairman of the Emirati government owned investment firm, MGX.

Al Mubarak is a member of the Board of Trustees for New York University, and oversaw the development of a campus in Abu Dhabi. He said a New York-based property lawyer, Marty Edelman, was a bridge between Abu Dhabi and the NYU during the “long, hard negotiations” before the campus was set up in 2010. Edelman is known as “Abu Dhabi’s Man in Manhattan” and is a trusted adviser of the Al Nahyan family. Valued for diplomacy and deal-making, Edelman also collaborated closely with Al Mubarak and Sheikh Mansour to help facilitate their acquisition of Manchester City F.C. in 2008.

Al Mubarak was the first chairman of board of Imperial College London Diabetes Center (ICLDC) which opened in Abu Dhabi in 2006.

== Sport ==
=== Motorsport ===
Al Mubarak, as chairman of the Abu Dhabi Motor Sport Management Company (ADMM), worked to bring auto racing to the region and negotiated the deal with FIA for the Abu Dhabi Grand Prix Formula One motor race. The deal was officially announced in early 2007 at the Abu Dhabi F1 Festival in the UAE.

=== Football ===
In early September 2008, and after negotiations led by Dubai-born businessman Sulaiman Al-Fahim on behalf of the Abu Dhabi side, the owners of English Premier League football club Manchester City, including chairman Thaksin Shinawatra, agreed to sell the entirety of their shares to Sheikh Mansour bin Zayed Al Nahyan of Abu Dhabi. On Tuesday 23 September 2008, the deal was concluded and the shares were transferred to Abu Dhabi United Group, a United Arab Emirates-based private equity firm owned by Sheikh Mansour, in a deal that was both welcomed and questioned by some observers. In September 2008, the new owner appointed Al Mubarak as chairman of the board of directors of the club, with Garry Cook as Chief Executive. Cook would later resign in 2011 and be replaced by Ferran Soriano.

On 14 May 2011, City won the FA Cup, their first silverware after a drought of 35 years, by beating Stoke City 1–0 in the final. On 13 May 2012, with two goals scored in stoppage time in the last game of the season, played at their home stadium, and amidst "scenes of near bedlam", Manchester City were crowned champions of the Premier League, winning the top-division title for the first time since the 1967–68 season. The club's finances reached a loss of £98 million in 2011–12 but improved to show an £11 million profit in 2014–15, and then in the 2015–16 season a profit of £20.5 million with "record" revenues of £398.1 million.

Since 2013, Mubarak has been the chairman of City Football Group, a holding company that invests in and manages various international football-related businesses, including Manchester City, New York City, Mumbai City and Melbourne City. In 2019, the City Football Group decided under his leadership to sell a 10% stake to Silver Lake for $500 million.

==== Controversies ====
A decade after the UAE acquired Manchester City, documents by Football Leaks revealed that the Abu Dhabi owner and chairman together circumvented the Financial Fair Play (FFP) regulations, which were introduced by UEFA. Mansour bin Zayed and Khaldoon Al Mubarak were essentially alleged by rights groups of attempting to “sportswash” the “deeply tarnished image” of their country by funneling money into the club.

In 2018, a report by German magazine Der Spiegel, based on leaked internal emails and documents, alleged that Sheikh Mansour's Abu Dhabi United Group (ADUG) financed the sponsorship payments himself. In order to escape the FFP rules, direct money from Emirati owners was wired to sponsor companies based in UAE, including Etihad Airways and Aabar Investment, which was then transferred into the club. ADUG's accounts were managed by Mubarak's Abu Dhabi government agency, Executive Affairs Authority (EAA). Besides, the money flows from government into the team were approved by Mubarak. The Emirati owners created a "closed payment loop", where they set up a shell company, Fordham Sports Management, to pay players for their image rights. Usually players are paid by the club for their image rights. But for City, it was Fordham, which received £11 million annually from the Abu Dhabi owners. The channel allowed the club to hide expenditure, and to save €30 million in marketing income. A main person involved in such deals and negotiations between Abu Dhabi and City was Simon Pearce, an Australian who worked in EAA. Before making any multimillion-euro transfers to the club, Pearce was supposed to seek for permission from the chairman, Mubarak, who would approve all the transactions.

Manchester City replied to the reports stating that they were based on "hacked or stolen" emails or documents, but did not say that the leaked emails were fake. In March 2019, UEFA opened the investigation into the alleged breach of FFP rules by the City owner and the chairman. In February 2020, the club was banned from the Champions League for 2 years, with a fine of €30 million. But, in July 2020, the Court of Arbitration for Sport (CAS) lifted the ban and reduced the fine to €10 million, stating that majority of the violations were "either not established or time-barred". In April 2022, leaked emails were re-published by Der Spiegel. The report claimed that Manchester City was being investigated by the Premier League in terms of three allegations– The club pressured underage players to sign with City, disguising owner's funding as sponsorship payments, and secretly paid compensation to Roberto Mancini through Al Jazira.

In February 2023, Manchester City was alleged by the Premier League, which had concluded a four-year long investigation, of contravening more than 100 regulations on various occasions, most of which relating to finances. The league said City had provided misleading information about their finances for a nine-year period under Al Mubarak and Sheikh Mansour, with an independent commission to review the case. The Premier League's charges included 80 alleged breaches concerning the financial rules in 2009–18 and 30 breaches related to City's alleged lack of cooperation with the investigation since December 2018. The club subsequently released a statement, welcoming the appointment of an independent commission. In September 2026, the club was found guilty of all charges relating to breaking the Premier League's financial rules through arranging "sham contracts" and misreporting the club's income, and guilty of all but one of the charges relating to non-cooperation with the investigation. The club have indicated they will appeal the decision.

== Personal life ==
Al Mubarak is married to Nadia Sehweil. The couple first met when they were both in high school. They have three children. Nadia, who is of Palestinian descent, runs a yoga, pilates and dance studio called Bodytree Studio in Abu Dhabi with her mother.

In 2007, Al Mubarak was made Commander of the Star of the Order of the Italian Solidarity for supporting the "economic relationship" between Italy and the UAE. In 2013, he was made an honorary Commander of the Order of the British Empire (CBE) and received the Grand Gwanghwa Medal, the highest class of the South Korean Order of Diplomatic Service Merit. Al Mubarak is a recipient of the Asian Business Leadership Forum's (ABLF) Award in 2016. He was named as one of the 100 world's most influential and powerful Arabs in 2017 and 2018 by Arabian Business.
