= Mahdi Al Tajir =

Emirati businessman (born 1931)

Mohammed Mahdi Al Tajir

United Arab Emirates Ambassador to United Kingdom
- In office 1971–1987
- President: Zayed bin Sultan Al Nahyan
- Preceded by: position established

United Arab Emirates Ambassador to France
- In office 1971–1980
- President: Zayed bin Sultan Al Nahyan
- Preceded by: position established
- Succeeded by: Khalifa Ahmad Mubarak

Personal details
- Born: 1932 or 1933 (age 93–94) Bahrain
- Children: 6
- Education: Preston Grammar School

Mohammed Mahdi Al Tajir (Arabic: محمد مهدي التاجر; born 1932 or 1933) is an Emirati businessman based in the United Kingdom. He was the first United Arab Emirates ambassador to the United Kingdom. Al Tajir spends much of his time at his London home or at Keir House, his 18,000-acre (73 km^{2}) Stirlingshire estate. He has interests in finance and property, and owns the Highland Spring bottled water company.

Al Tajir was named one of Scotland's richest men with wealth of £1.72 billion in the Sunday Times Rich List 2010.

== Life ==
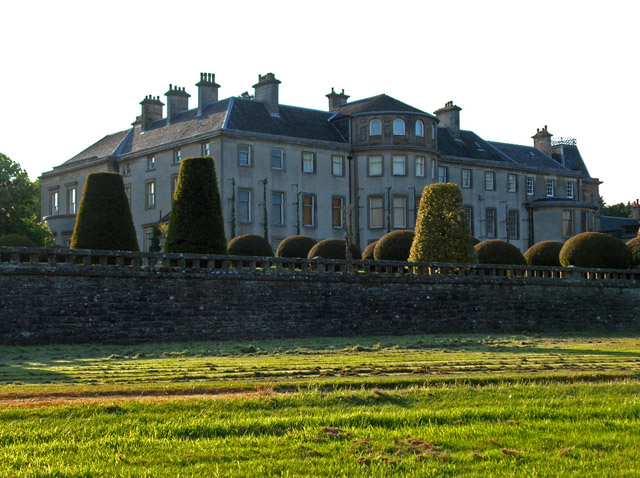
Keir House

Mohammed Mahdi Al Tajir was born in 1932 or 1933 in Bahrain, and educated at Preston Grammar School in Lancashire.

Al Tajir's 15,000 acre Blackford estate in Perthshire, Scotland is owned by his company Park Tower Holding Establishment, based in the tax haven of Liechtenstein. Al Tajir also owns London's Sheraton Park Tower Hotel at 101 Knightsbridge near Hyde Park and Mereworth Castle in Kent, which he purchased in 1976 for $1.2 million.

In the 1980s, he attempted to broker a peace deal in the Lebanese Civil War with his business partner Hani Salaam.

Al Tajir has an extensive collection of silver artifacts and carpets. In 1993 Al Tajir paid the record price for a piece of silver at auction, when he bought a 1736 silver chandelier made by Balthasar Friedrich Behrens for £2.27 million at Christie's in Monaco.

Al Tajir's son, Maher al-Tajir, was found guilty of assaulting his girlfriend at Keir House in 2009.

== Business career ==
Al Tajir was made the first Ambassador of the United Arab Emirates to the United Kingdom when the UAE was founded in 1971 and remained in post until 1987. Under a thinly disguised name, Al Tajir's exploits as a negotiator were recorded in the 1976 novel Dubai by Robin Moore.

In London in the late 1960s, the Egyptian businessman Mohamed Al-Fayed was introduced to Al Tajir by Salim Abu Alwan, an Iraqi businessman. Al Tajir informed Al-Fayed that Dubai was penniless and needed to borrow £1 million for the future construction of modern harbour facilities.

Al-Fayed secured a loan of £9 million from Imre Rochlitz, an American lawyer. Rochlitz's Jewish ancestry caused embarrassment to Al Tajir, and later caused Rochlitz to reject Al-Fayed's offer of a formal partnership. Al-Fayed earned £1.5 million commission from the contract for British engineering company Costain to carry out the improvement works to the port. Al-Fayed also assisted with securing the financing for the Dubai World Trade Centre.

By the mid 1970s Costain had gained over £280 million of contracts thanks to Al-Fayed and Al Tajir. Al Tajir's influence in Dubai was waning by 1977, and Al-Fayed was excluded from the commission process for a new aluminium smelter, and the development of Jebel Ali, putting Costain's future profits at risk. In 1993 Al-Fayed was visited at his department store Harrods by Mohammed Alabbar, the director of Dubai's Department of Economic Development. Alabbar had been appointed by Sheikh Maktoum to eradicate the system of large commission payments from previous decades. Al Tajir was challenged in the British courts to repay his alleged excessive profits earned from the construction of Dubai's aluminium smelter, and Al-Fayed was targeted over his management contract of the Dubai World Trade Centre.

The construction of Dubai's aluminium smelter caused Al Tajir to fall out with Sheikh Rashid's sons. In the judgement of a British court case, Al Tajir conspired to defraud Dubai Aluminium of millions of US dollars in connivance with commodities trader Marc Rich, who owned a neighbouring property in Switzerland.
