= Jamal Fakhro =

Bahraini legislator

- جمال بن محمد بن عبدالرحمن بن محمد بن حسن بن محمود آل فخرو
- Born: August 13, 1956 (age 68); Bahrain
- Occupation: Bahraini legislator

Jamal Mohamed Al-Fakhro is a Bahraini legislator, business advisor, and member of the Bahraini National Assembly. He is a Managing Partner of KPMG.

== Career ==
Fakhro was the first Arab to be appointed as a member of the KPMG Global Board and Global council. Fakhro was the chairman of the KPMG Middle East and South Asia (MESA) Board and a member of the KPMG Europe, Middle East and Africa (EMA) Regional Board until October 2014. Having served as managing partner since 1987, he has extensive experience in the field of both Audit and Tax and Advisory services in the region, especially for the government, banking, and financial services sectors. He also advises family businesses in relation to family governance, risk, and sustainable succession planning. Fakhro has a special interest in the matters of corporate governance. He is a founding board member of the Pearl Initiative in the Middle East, an initiative developed in collaboration with the UN Office for Partnerships. The Pearl Initiative aims for transparency and accountability in the private sector.

== Early life and education ==
Fakhro joined Fakhro Establishment for Accounting and Auditing after graduating from Cairo University with a degree in accounting in 1977. At that time, the firm was focused on national work and clients. It had less than 15 employees. Fakhro worked with the firm's partners to become a national representative firm of KPMG in 1982. In 1988 he led the negotiations to merge the operations of Fakhro Establishment and Peat Marwick to establish KPMG Fakhro in Bahrain.

== Public interest ==
Fakhro has been a member of the Bahraini National Assembly since 1992 and the First Vice Chairman for a number of legislative terms. While in the assembly, he was the chairman of the Committee on Financial and Economic Affairs. Fakhro was also a member of the committee that prepared the National Action Charter of Bahrain. He was later a member of the committee that activated the National Action Charter in 2002. Additionally, he was on the committee involved in the 2011 National Dialogue and the National Committee to follow up on the implementation of the Bahrain Independent Commission of Inquiry (BICI) Report (2011–2012). As a legislator, he has also headed the Bahrain delegation to the Inter-Parliamentary Union since 2007.

== Recognitions ==
Fakhro was recognized and honored with the second-class Sheikh Isa bin Salman Al Khalifa medal by His Majesty King Hamad bin Isa Al Khalifa at the opening ceremony of the eighth session of former Shura Council.

== Membership ==
He is a member of the American Institute of Certified Public Accountants (AICPA).
