= List of ambassadors of Australia to Laos =

Ambassador of Australia to Laos

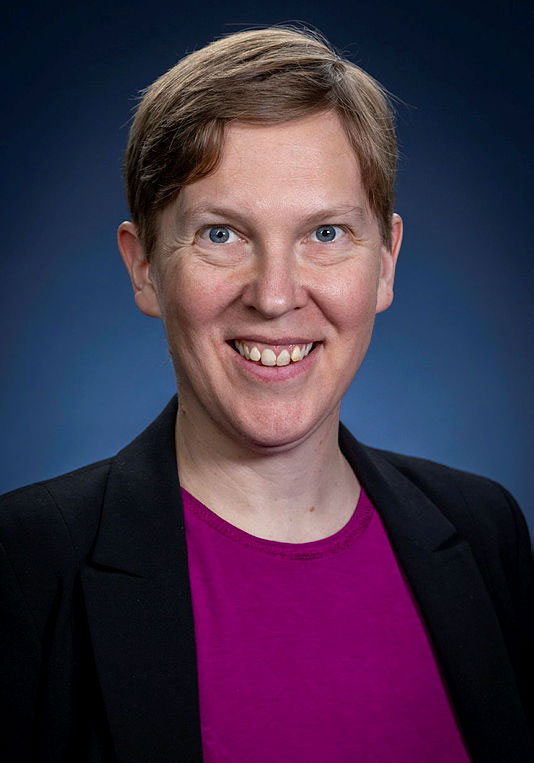
- Incumbent; Megan Jones since 12 November 2023
- Department of Foreign Affairs and Trade
- Style: His Excellency
- Reports to: Minister for Foreign Affairs
- Residence: Vientiane
- Nominator: Prime Minister of Australia
- Appointer: Governor General of Australia
- Inaugural holder: Arthur Morris
- Formation: 1963

The Ambassador of Australia to Laos is an officer of the Australian Department of Foreign Affairs and Trade and the head of the Embassy of the Commonwealth of Australia to the Lao People's Democratic Republic. The Ambassador resides in Vientiane. The Australian Government first announced it would open an embassy in Vientiane in 1962. The current ambassador, since February 2021, is Paul Kelly.

== List of heads of mission ==
Ordinal	Officeholder	Title	Term start date	Term end date	Time in office	Notes
1	David McNicol	Minister to Laos	1955	1956	0–1 years	
2	Frederick Blakeney	Minister to Laos	1956	1957	0–1 years	
3	Bill Forsyth	Minister to Laos	1959	1960	0–1 years	
4	Arthur Morris	Minister to Laos	1960	1963	3–4 years	
4	Arthur Morris	Ambassador of Australia to Laos	1963	1964	3–4 years	
5	Barrie Dexter	Ambassador of Australia to Laos	1964	1967	2–3 years	
6	John Ryan	Ambassador of Australia to Laos	1968	1969	0–1 years	
7	Peter Curtis	Ambassador of Australia to Laos	1970	1972	1–2 years	
8	A. H. Borthwick	Ambassador of Australia to Laos	1973	1976	2–3 years	
9	J. A. Forsythe	Ambassador of Australia to Laos	1977	1978	0–1 years	
10	Bruce Woodberry	Ambassador of Australia to Laos	1979	1980	0–1 years	
11	Philip Peters	Ambassador of Australia to Laos	1981	1985	3–4 years	
12	J. B. Campbell	Ambassador of Australia to Laos	1986	1986	0 years	
13	P. A. Jackson	Ambassador of Australia to Laos	1987	1990	2–3 years	
14	M. D. Mann	Ambassador of Australia to Laos	1991	1994	2–3 years	
15	Roland Rich	Ambassador of Australia to Laos	1994	1997	2–3 years	
16	Karina Campbell	Ambassador of Australia to Laos	1997	2000	2–3 years	
17	Michael Jonathan Thwaites	Ambassador of Australia to Laos	2000	2004	3–4 years	
18	Alistair Charles Maclean	Ambassador of Australia to Laos	2004	2007	2–3 years	
19	Michele Forster	Ambassador of Australia to Laos	2007	2011	3–4 years	
20	Lynda Worthaisong	Ambassador of Australia to Laos	2011	2014	2–3 years	
21	John Williams	Ambassador of Australia to Laos	2014	2018	3–4 years	
22	Jean-Bernard Carrasco	Ambassador of Australia to Laos	January 2018	2020	1–2 years	
23	Paul Kelly	Ambassador of Australia to Laos	5 February 2021	incumbent	5 years, 214 days	
