= United Nations Office =

United Nations Office may refer to:

One of the three regional office complexes located away from United Nations Headquarters in New York City:
- United Nations Office at Geneva (UNOG)
- United Nations Office at Nairobi (UNON)
- United Nations Office at Vienna (UNON)
Offices of the United Nations Secretariat:
- United Nations Office for Disarmament Affairs (UNODA)
- United Nations Office for Disaster Risk Reduction (UNDRR)
- United Nations Office for Outer Space Affairs (UNOOSA)
- United Nations Office for Partnerships (UNOP)
- United Nations Office for the Coordination of Humanitarian Affairs (OCHA)
- United Nations Office of Counter-Terrorism (UNOCT)
- United Nations Office of Internal Oversight Services (OIOS)
- United Nations Office of Legal Affairs (OLA)
- United Nations Office on Drugs and Crime (UNODC)
Independent organizations:
- United Nations Office for Project Services (UNOPS)
