= Crescent Enterprises =

Emirati-based conglomerate

- Industry: Conglomerate
- Area served: Worldwide
- Key people: Badr Jafar (chief executive officer)
- Products: Ports; Logistics; Business Aviation; Power and Engineering; Health care; Private equity; Venture Capital; Business Incubation; Food and Beverage; Sustainable Mobility
- Website: crescententerprises.com

Crescent Enterprises is a multinational company headquartered in Sharjah, United Arab Emirates. The company operates through four platforms: CE-Operates, CE-Invests, CE-Ventures, and CE-Creates, across sectors that include ports and logistics, food and beverages, and business aviation as well as across business verticals, such as private equity, venture capital, and business incubation.

Crescent Enterprises, created in 2007, is a subsidiary of the Crescent Group, a family business group operating in the MENA region since 1971. The Crescent Group's other subsidiary, Crescent Petroleum, is a privately-owned upstream oil and gas company in the Middle East.

== History ==
Crescent Enterprises was founded in 2007. The company initially operated under three platforms, focusing on strategic investments and venture capital. In 2014, the group launched business incubation platform CE-Creates to develop early-stage concepts into viable ventures.

In 2017, the company reorganized its operations across the four platforms: CE-Operates, CE Invests, CE-Ventures, and CE-Creates.

=== Gulftainer Group ===
Gulftainer was formed in 1976 in the UAE to operate the container terminal in the Middle East, the Sharjah Container Terminal at Port Khalid. As of 2025, it operates in ports in the UAE, Saudi Arabia, Iraq, and the United States. The company expanded its operations to Iraq in 2008, becoming the first international company to establish a container terminal at Umm Qasr port. In 2013, Gulftainer acquired a 51% stake in Gulf Stevedoring Contracting Company, gaining management of three terminals in Jeddah and Jubail.

In 2014, Gulftainer became the first Middle Eastern port operator with operations in the US, with a 35-year concession at Florida's Port Canaveral. In March 2018, the company won a 50- year concession to operate a second US port in Wilmington, Delaware through its US subsidiary GT USA Wilmington. GT USA Wilmington later withdrew from developing the Port of Wilmington in 2023.
