= Razan Al Mubarak =

Emirati business executive

Razan Khalifa Al Mubarak
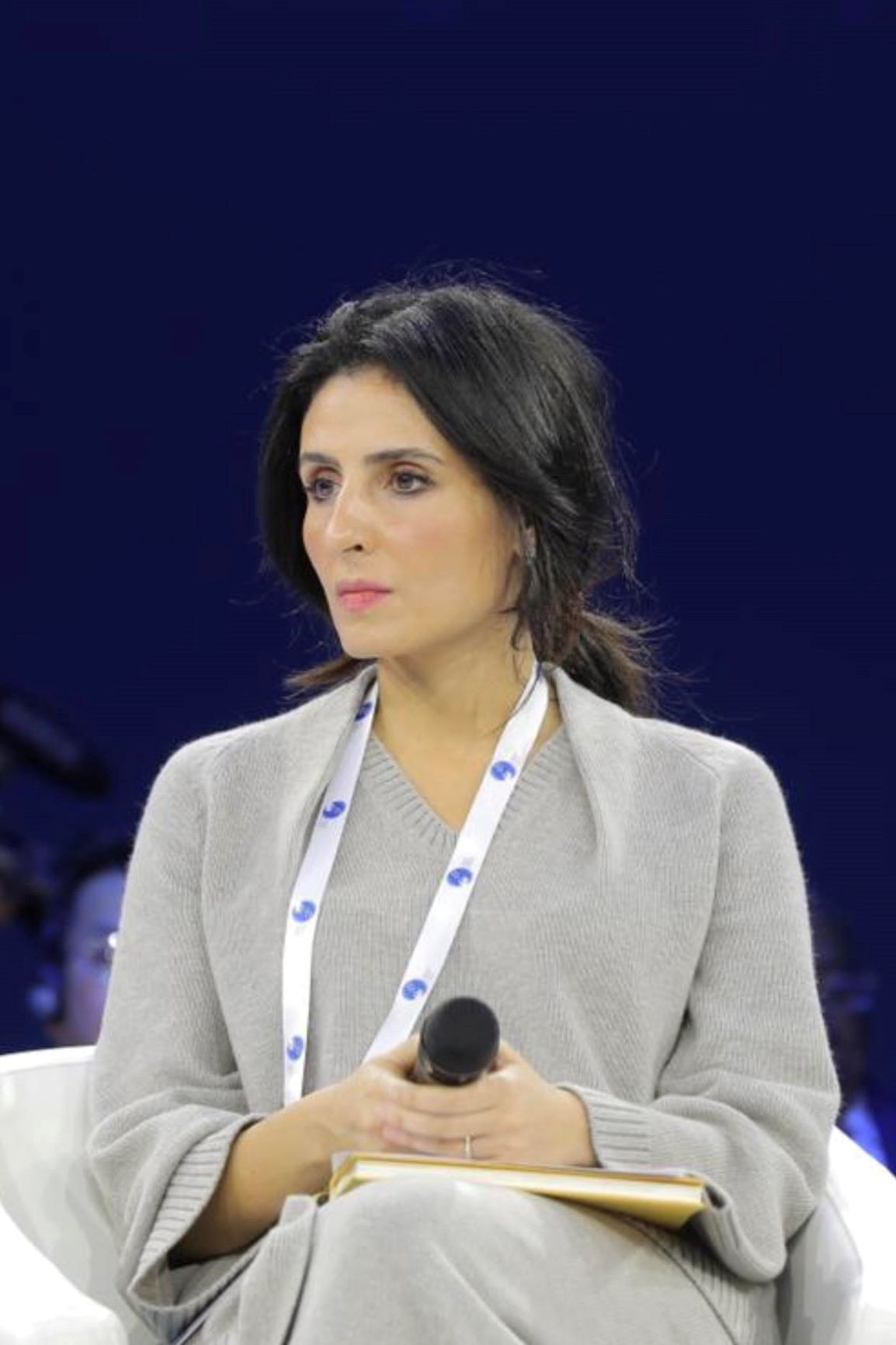
- Al Mubarak in 2019
- Born: 1979 (age 46–47); Abu Dhabi, United Arab Emirates
- Education: Tufts University (BA); University College of London (MSc)
- Employer: Environment Agency Abu Dhabi
- Organizations: Mohamed bin Zayed Species Conservation Fund; Emirates Nature–WWF
- Board member of: Federal Authority for Nuclear Regulation; International Center for Biosaline Agriculture
- Spouse: Badr Jafar
- Relatives: Khaldoon Khalifa Al Mubarak (brother)
- Website: razanalmubarak.com

Razan Khalifa Al Mubarak (Arabic: رزان خليفة المبارك; born 1979) is an Emirati businesswoman who is serving as the managing director of the Environment Agency Abu Dhabi (EAD), and the Mohamed bin Zayed Species Conservation Fund as well as the current president of the International Union for Conservation of Nature.

== Early life ==
Al Mubarak was born in 1979 in Abu Dhabi. She is the daughter of Khalifa Ahmed Abdulaziz Al-Mubarak, and Sameera Al Khamis. Al Mubarak's grandfather was Ahmed Abdulaziz Hamad Al-Mubarak, former judge and chairperson of the Shari'a Judicial Department in the Emirate of Abu Dhabi. Al Mubarak has three siblings: Rasha; Khaldoon Al Mubarak, managing director of Mubadala Investment Company; and Mohamed Khalifa Al-Mubarak, Chairman of Abu Dhabi Tourism & Culture Authority.

Al Mubarak holds an M.Sc. in Public Understanding of Environmental Change from the University College London and a BA in Environmental Studies and International Relations from Tufts University.

== Career ==
In 2001, Al Mubarak helped establish Emirates Nature–WWF (EN–WWF)—a UAE affiliate of the WWF. She is its managing director. In 2008, she became the founding managing director of the Mohamed bin Zayed Species Conservation Fund (MBZ Fund).

She is the managing director of the Environment Agency - Abu Dhabi (EAD). Appointed in 2011, she was the first woman to serve as secretary general and was promoted to its board of directors in 2018 by the crown prince of Abu Dhabi, Mohammed bin Zayed Al Nahyan. Under Al Mubarak, the EAD played a key role to reintroduce the scimitar-horned oryx into the wild in Chad.

She is on the board of the Federal Authority for Nuclear Regulation and the International Center for Biosaline Agriculture. In addition, she serves as an advisory board member of the Rockefeller Foundation Economic Council on Planetary Health, the Cambridge Conservation Initiative, the Emirates Diplomatic Academy, a board member of Panthera, and board member to the Abu Dhabi Music & Arts Foundation (ADMAF).

In September 2021, she was elected as the president of International Union for Conservation of Nature for a 4-year term, becoming the second woman to be elected to lead the organization in the organization's history. In 2013, the Abu Dhabi American Chamber of Commerce awarded Al Mubarak the Women in Business Award. In 2018, the World Economic Forum appointed her as a Young Global Leader of the Forum.

== Publications ==
Al Mubarak together with the advisory board of the MBZ Fund published an article in the journal Current Biology about the importance and benefits of species, which argued that species cannot be evaluated based on their economic value alone and should be understood for their cultural and inherent value as living organisms.

- Gascon, Claude; Brooks, Thomas M.; Contreras-MacBeath, Topiltzin; Heard, Nicolas; Konstant, William; Lamoreux, John; Launay, Frederic; Maunder, Michael; Mittermeier, Russell A.; Molur, Sanjay; Al Mubarak, Razan Khalifa (2015-05-18). "The Importance and Benefits of Species". Current Biology. 25 (10): R431–R438. doi:10.1016/j.cub.2015.03.041. ISSN 0960-9822. PMID 25989087.

== Personal life ==
Al Mubarak is married to Badr Jafar, an Emirati businessperson. They are signatories to Bill and Melinda Gates' and Warren Buffett's "The Giving Pledge". They have publicly committed more than half of their wealth to philanthropy.
