= Pearl Initiative =

Non-profit organization

- Logo of the Pearl Initiative
- Abbreviation: PI
- Formation: September 2010; 16 years ago
- Region served: Persian Gulf region of the Middle East
- Founders: Badr Jafar; Amir Dossal
- Executive Director: Ranya Saadawi
- Website: www.pearlinitiative.org

The Pearl Initiative is a non-profit organization founded in 2010 that focuses on corporate governance, accountability and transparency in the Persian Gulf region. The Pearl Initiative has been involved with the Siemens Integrity Initiative, and the Bill & Melinda Gates Foundation.

== History ==
The Pearl Initiative was founded in 2010 in cooperation with the United Nations Office for Partnerships. The organization was granted Special Consultative Status with the United Nations Economic and Social Council in 2019.

== Structure and key people ==
The Pearl Initiative's board of governors and CEO council is made up of members representing Saudi Aramco, Tadawul, Shell, Ernst & Young, among others.

In 2018, the Pearl Initiative's board of governors established a student advisory board made up of students from the American University of Sharjah, Effat University, Ahlia University, Abu Dhabi University and Prince Sultan University.

In 2021, the Pearl Initiative announced the appointment of Ranya Saadawi as its executive director.
