= Jon Blair =

South African-born British film director and producer

Jon Blair, CBE (born 1950), is a South African-born British writer, film producer, and director of documentaries, drama, and comedy.

== Biography ==
Jon Blair was born in South Africa in 1950. After evading conscription into the South African Defence Force in 1966, he fled to England. He has won an Academy Award, two Emmy Awards, an International Documentary Association Distinguished Achievement Award, and a BAFTA. He was appointed Commander of the Order of the British Empire (CBE) in the 2015 Birthday Honours for services to film. In 1994, Blair received an honorary doctorate from Stockton University (then Richard Stockton College) for advancing human rights awareness through film.

In 2003, Blair served as a visiting professor at Stockton, teaching a cross-disciplinary course on real-world issue research.

== Documentaries ==
Blair's 1995 documentary Anne Frank Remembered won the Academy Award for Best Documentary Feature and an International Emmy Award. It also received awards at the Chicago International Film Festival, Hamptons International Film Festival, and others.

His 1983 BAFTA-winning documentary Schindler, narrated by Dirk Bogarde, preceded Steven Spielberg's Schindler's List and served as a research resource for the film. Blair re-released Schindler in 2019 with Ben Kingsley narrating.

Blair's 2022 documentary Navalny: The Man Putin Couldn't Kill won the Gold Nymph Award at the Monte Carlo Television Festival.

As Head of Documentaries for Al Jazeera English (2011–2013), Blair executive-produced Bahrain: Shouting in the Dark, which won a George Polk Award and Amnesty International Media Award.

Other works include:

- Dancing with the Devil (2009), examining Rio de Janeiro's drug wars.
- Ochberg's Orphans (2007), Oscar-shortlisted for Best Short Documentary.
- Murder Most Foul (2007), a crime documentary for Channel 4.

== Theatrical films ==
- Monster in a Box (1991), produced by Blair and directed by Nick Broomfield, featuring Spalding Gray.

== Drama and comedy ==
Blair co-created Spitting Image (1984–1987), winning two Emmys. Other works include BBC's Dawn French's Girls Who Do: Comedy (2006).

== Theatre ==
Blair authored The Biko Inquest (1978), a play about Steve Biko's death, staged by the Royal Shakespeare Company and starring Albert Finney.
