= Middle East Theatre Academy =

United Arab Emirates theatre school

- Type: Non Profit
- Established: February 2011
- Location: Sharjah, United Arab Emirates
- Website: www.middleeasttheatreacademy.org/

The Middle East Theatre Academy (META) is a programme aimed to introduce young actors to the art of theatre and stage performance in the Middle East. The academy was launched by Emirati businessperson Badr Jafar and Hollywood screen actor, director and producer Kevin Spacey. The program was launched in February 2011.

== History ==
Kevin Spacey directing students of Home Grown for the premier of 'Dhow Under the Sun' in Sharjah, UAE

In February 2011, Emirati businessman Badr Jafar and Hollywood actor Kevin Spacey, launched The Middle East Theatre Academy (META). The non-profit academy aims to discover talented young actors, directors and producers from the Middle East.

Although open to applicants from all backgrounds, META was designed to offer an opportunity for underprivileged, talented youth to upskill by means of workshops, master classes and special events. With the help of industry professionals, participants are instructed in areas of performance, directing, writing, producing, stage management, lighting, set design, costumes, and makeup application.

== Home Grown ==
Students of Home Grown performing Dhow Under the Sun

In collaboration with the Kevin Spacey Foundation (KSF), on January 25, 2015, META also launched Home Grown — an initiative to discover and train young artistic talent across the Middle East. From over a group of 300 applicants, 34 young men and women from 12 countries were selected to complete the inaugural edition of the two-week training programme in Sharjah, United Arab Emirates. The culmination of the programme was an Arabic and English play titled Dhow Under the Sun, directed by Matt Wilde and written by Iraqi playwright Hassan Abdulrazzak. It was inspired by the lives of displaced youth across the Middle East, and specifically commissioned for the Home Grown students to perform to an audience at the Sharjah Institute for Theatrical Arts.
