= International Centre of Insect Physiology and Ecology =

Kenyan-based research institute

- Abbreviation: ICIPE
- Formation: 1970
- Type: INGO
- Location: Nairobi, Kenya
- Region served: Worldwide
- Official language: English, French
- Website: www.icipe.org

The International Centre of Insect Physiology and Ecology (ICIPE, branded as icipe) is an international scientific research institute, headquartered in Nairobi, Kenya that works towards improving lives and livelihoods of people in Africa.

Icipe was founded in 1970 by a Kenyan entomologist, Thomas Odhiambo, with strong encouragement from Carl Djerassi, a professor of Chemistry at Stanford University.

Icipe is a member of Association of International Research and Development Centers for Agriculture (AIRCA).

The center's main objective is to research and develop alternative and environmentally friendly pest and vector management strategies that are effective, selective, non-polluting, non-resistance inducing, and which are affordable to resource-limited rural and urban communities. icipe's mandate extends to the conservation and use of the rich insect biodiversity found in Africa.

Today, icipe is the only international center in sub-Saharan Africa working primarily on arthropods. icipe focuses on sustainable development using human health as the basis and the environment as the foundation for sustainability.

Icipe works in a holistic and integrated approach through a 4-H paradigm—Human, Animal, Plant and Environmental Health—with the aim of improving the overall health of communities in tropical Africa by addressing the interlinked problems of poverty, poor health, low agricultural productivity and degradation of the environment.

== Human health ==
Icipe recognises that an increase in productivity depends on a healthy workforce. The institute considers that, in addition to burdening the health infrastructures, diseases such as malaria limit the capabilities and outputs of farmers in Africa. The center therefore focuses on improving the health of people, especially in sub-Saharan Africa, so that they can play a vital role in the society and economy. They found a parasite called Microsporidium MB in Anopheles arabiensis. Findings are related to disability to infect Plasmodium falciparum.

== Animal health ==
Pests and diseases in livestock continue to hold back development in large parts of Africa. icipe supports the prime role of domestic animals by developing and promoting appropriate, environmentally friendly and intelligent technologies for the sustainable management of disease vectors, such as tsetse flies. icipe is one of the few organisations conducting research into the control of ticks and tick-borne diseases. In this area, icipe is incorporating indigenous knowledge to develop integrated strategies which rely on biological control, use of botanicals and behavioural modification of the cues ticks use to find hosts and mates.

== Plant health ==
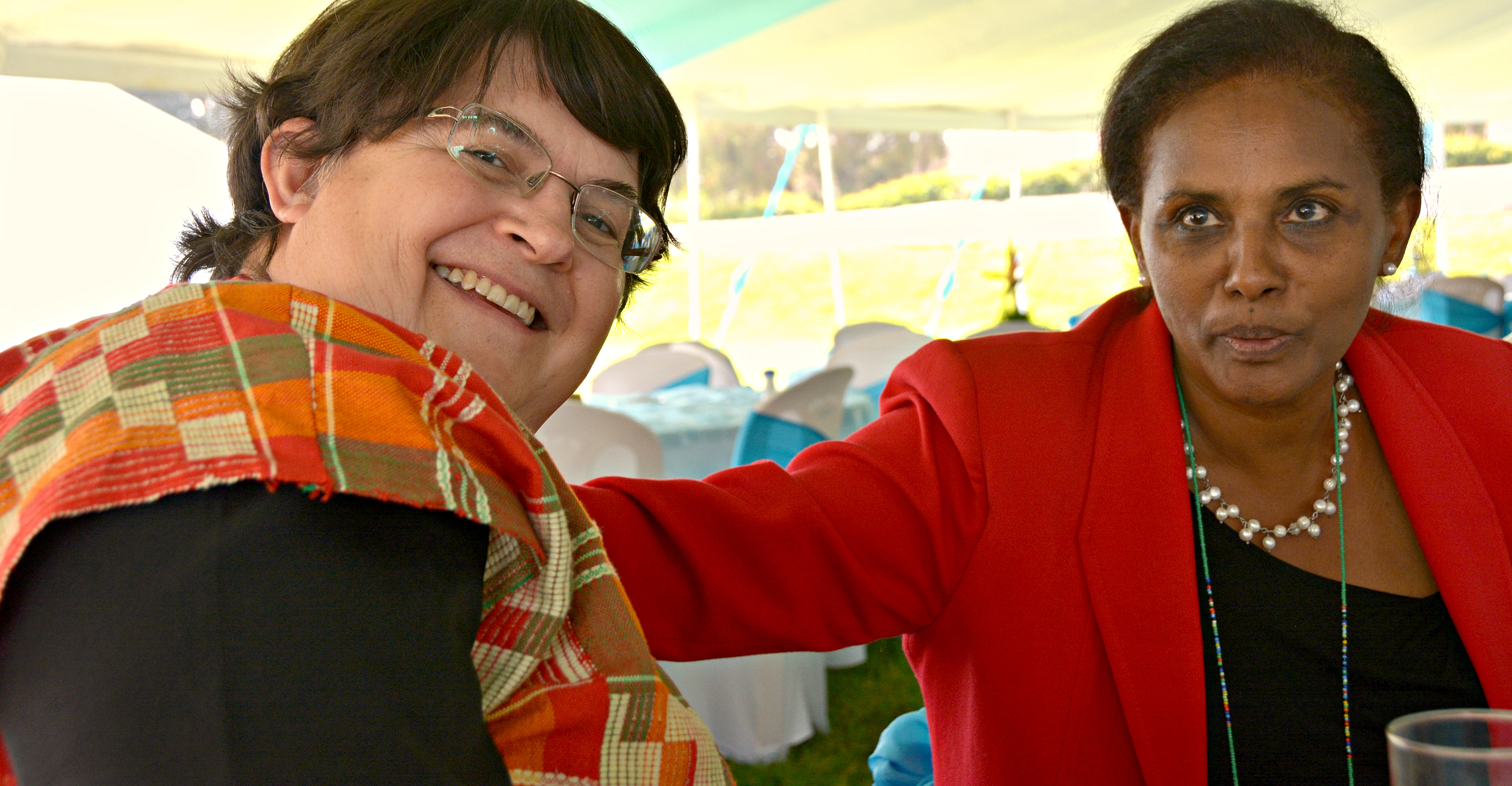
Jan Low, regional director for Africa of the International Potato Center, catches up with Segenet Kelemu, director general of the ICIPE.

icipe contributes to sustainable food security in Africa through the development of integrated pest management systems for major agricultural and horticultural crops. Such strategies include biological control, use of behaviour modification and arthropod-active botanicals. icipe emphasises control approaches that have no detrimental impact on the environment. These options are always designed to fit the needs of the farmers and are developed on the farm with farmers' participation. Key areas of icipe's plant health research include pests of tomatoes, brassicas, beans, fruits and of staple food crops like maize and sorghum, as well as locusts and other outbreak pests.

== Environmental health ==
icipe's commercial insect-technology packages are designed to assist communities in East Africa to improve their livelihoods through income-generating activities like silk and honey production. The center hosts the African Reference Laboratory for Bee Health, the first laboratory of its kind in sub-Saharan Africa that centers on insect pollinator research for sustainable food production in the region. Research outputs from the center feed policymaking outfits on ecosystem maintenance and pollinator conservation for sustainable food security and livelihood improvement.

== Capacity building ==
Capacity building of individual researchers and institutions in Africa is an integral part of all its research and development activities. icipe's Capacity Building Programme aims to promote the development and use of sustainable arthropod management technologies by enhancing the research and training capabilities of countries in Africa. The centre's efforts are geared towards three major areas of activity which include the training of African nationals for leadership roles in insect science, enhancing national capacities for technology diffusion, adoption and utilisation and facilitating the dissemination and exchange of information. In turn, these objectives are realized through three key programmes: postgraduate training at PhD and MSc levels, the professional development schemes for scientists of any nationality and the non-degree training courses for scientists, community members and extension workers. The African Regional Postgraduate Programme in Insect Science (ARPPIS) programme, a partnership with 32 African universities, with financial support from German Academic Exchange Programme, offers three-year doctoral research fellowships, aimed at preparing young scholars from Africa for regional leadership roles, as well as internationally competitive research careers, in arthropod-related sciences.

== Field stations ==
Icipe's headquarter is in Kasarani, Nairobi behind Moi Kasarani Sports ground off Thika Road. It has a major field research centre at Mbita Point in Homa Bay on Lake Victoria. There are four field sites in Kenya and one at Port Sudan in Sudan (on the Red Sea). Icipe also runs a "Biovillage Initiative" in southern Ethiopia.

== Notable people ==
- Zeyaur Khan, professor and the principal scientist

== See also ==
- Montreal Insectarium
- Push-pull technology
- List of universities in Kenya
- Education in Kenya
