= Association of International Research and Development Centers for Agriculture =

International research institute

- Abbreviation: AIRCA
- Formation: 2012;14 years ago
- Type: International umbrella body
- Purpose: International coordination of agricultural research and development
- Region served: Worldwide
- Members: Six member organizations
- Chairperson: Dr. Albin Hubscher, President and CEO, IFDC
- Executive Secretary: Peace Tusasirwe
- Website: www.airca.org

The Association of International Research and Development Centers for Agriculture (AIRCA) is an international, non-profit alliance focused on increasing food security by supporting smallholder agriculture and rural enterprise within healthy, sustainable and climate-smart landscapes.

== Overview and focus ==
AIRCA unites six international agricultural research and development centers which focus on a diverse mix of commodities, crops and issues including tropical agriculture, vegetable production, bamboo and rattan, insect pests, fertilizer use, underutilized crops, biosaline agriculture and sustainable development in mountains.

The members of AIRCA address sustainable agriculture and the environment at the landscape level. The centers create solutions that take into account the diversity of interactions among people and the environment, agricultural and non-agricultural systems, the crossing of national boundaries and other factors that represent the entire context of agriculture.

AIRCA members serve more than 60 countries comprising over 70% of the world’s population from across the Americas, Africa and the Asia-Pacific region. The broad alliance has collective access to a wide variety of crops and ecosystems.

The combined resources of AIRCA can be used to achieve 10 of the 17 Sustainable Development Goals (SDGs) established by the United Nations in 2015.

== Relationship to CGIAR and FAO ==
AIRCA member organizations work with crops of high economic, social, nutritional and ecological value. This complements and contrasts with the work of the Food and Agriculture Organization (FAO) and the CGIAR who work primarily in staple crops.

AIRCA does have some overlap with the CGIAR, however the CGIAR generally focuses more on agricultural research while AIRCA has more of a concentration on the implementation of agricultural research and development communication. AIRCA has a strong orientation toward problem solving at a system level, rather than a focus on a single commodity.

== History ==
AIRCA was launched on 2 March 2012 at the headquarters of the Food and Agriculture Organization (FAO) in Rome, Italy.

It was publicly presented in Punta del Este, Uruguay, on 30 October 2012 during the second Global Conference on Agricultural Research for Development.

== Members ==
As of March 2016 the members of AIRCA are:
Member Name and Overview	Acronym	Headquarters Location
World Vegetable Center Previously "Asian Vegetable Research and Development Center". Alleviation of poverty and malnutrition in the developing world through the increased production and consumption of safe vegetables.	AVRDC	Shanhua, Taiwan
CAB International Previously "Commonwealth Agricultural Bureaux". Improves people’s lives by providing information and applying scientific expertise to solve problems in agriculture and the environment.	CABI	Wallingford, England, United Kingdom
International Center for Biosaline Agriculture Enables water short countries to improve their agricultural productivity, social equity and environmental sustainability through the effective use of marginal quality water.	ICBA	Dubai, United Arab Emirates
International Centre for Integrated Mountain Development Enables and facilitates the equitable and sustainable well-being of the people of the Hindu Kush-Himalayas by supporting sustainable mountain development through active regional cooperation.	ICIMOD	Kathmandu, Nepal
International Centre of Insect Physiology and Ecology Helps alleviate poverty, ensure food security and improve the overall health status of peoples of the tropics by developing and extending management tools and strategies for harmful and useful arthropods, while preserving the natural resource base through research and capacity building.	ICIPE	Nairobi, Kenya
International Fertilizer Development Center Enables smallholder farmers in developing countries to increase agricultural productivity, generate economic growth and practice environmental stewardship by enhancing their ability to manage mineral and organic fertilizers responsibly and participate profitably in input and output markets.	IFDC	Muscle Shoals, Alabama, United States
