= Zeyaur Khan =

Zeyaur R. Khan is a professor and the principal scientist at International Centre of Insect Physiology and Ecology (icipe). He has dedicated his 30-year career as an international agricultural scientist to advancing the science and practice of agriculture by studying and applying chemical ecology, behavior, plant-plant and insect-plant interactions to improve farm productivity to combat poverty and food insecurity in Africa. He is responsible for the discovery and wide scale implementation of a pro-poor scientific innovation for enhancing food security and environmental sustainability in Africa]. This was achieved through the biologically-based IPM technology called "Push-Pull", developed for small-holder cereal-livestock African farmers. Prof. Khan’s work is an example demonstrating that creativity and innovation in science can provide practical solutions for the real problems of thousands of small-holder poor farmers and promote their food security and sustainable livelihoods.

== Career ==
- M.S. (1977) entomology, Indian Agricultural Research Institute, New Delhi, India
- Ph.D.(1980) entomology, Indian Agricultural Research Institute, New Delhi, India, Research on insect-plant interactions in cotton
- Postdoctoral fellow (1983–1985). International Rice Research Institute, Philippines, Research on chemical ecology of rice leafhoppers and planthoppers
- Research associate (1985–1986) University of Wisconsin, Madison, WI, USA, Research on mechanism of resistance in soybean to lepidopteran insects

== Appointments ==
- 1993–present. Principal scientist and leader of Habitat Management Program, International Centre of Insect Physiology and Ecology (ICIPE), Nairobi, Kenya
- 2009–present. Visiting Professor, Entomology Department, Cornell University, Ithaca, NY
- 1991-1993. Visiting Scientist, Kansas State University, Manhattan, KS
- 1986-1991. Entomologist, International Rice Research Institute, Philippines
- 1985-1986. Research Associate (1985-1986) University of Wisconsin, Madison, WI
- 1983-1985. Post-Doctoral Fellow, International Rice Research Institute, Philippines
- 1980-1983. Assistant Professor of Entomology, Rajendra Agricultural University, India

== Recent Awards and Recognitions ==
- 2010, Fellow, Entomological Society of America
- 2010, Fellow, Royal Entomological Society, London, UK
- 2010, Nan-Yao Su Award for Innovation and Creativity in Entomology
- 2010, Distinguished Scientist, International Branch of Entomological Society of America
- 2010, Elected on the Council of International Congress of Entomology
- 2009, International Integrated Pest Management Excellence Award
- 2009, Visiting Professor, Cornell University, Ithaca, New York
- 2008, Plenary speaker, International Congress of Entomology, July 2008
