= Lynda Worthaisong =

Australian diplomat

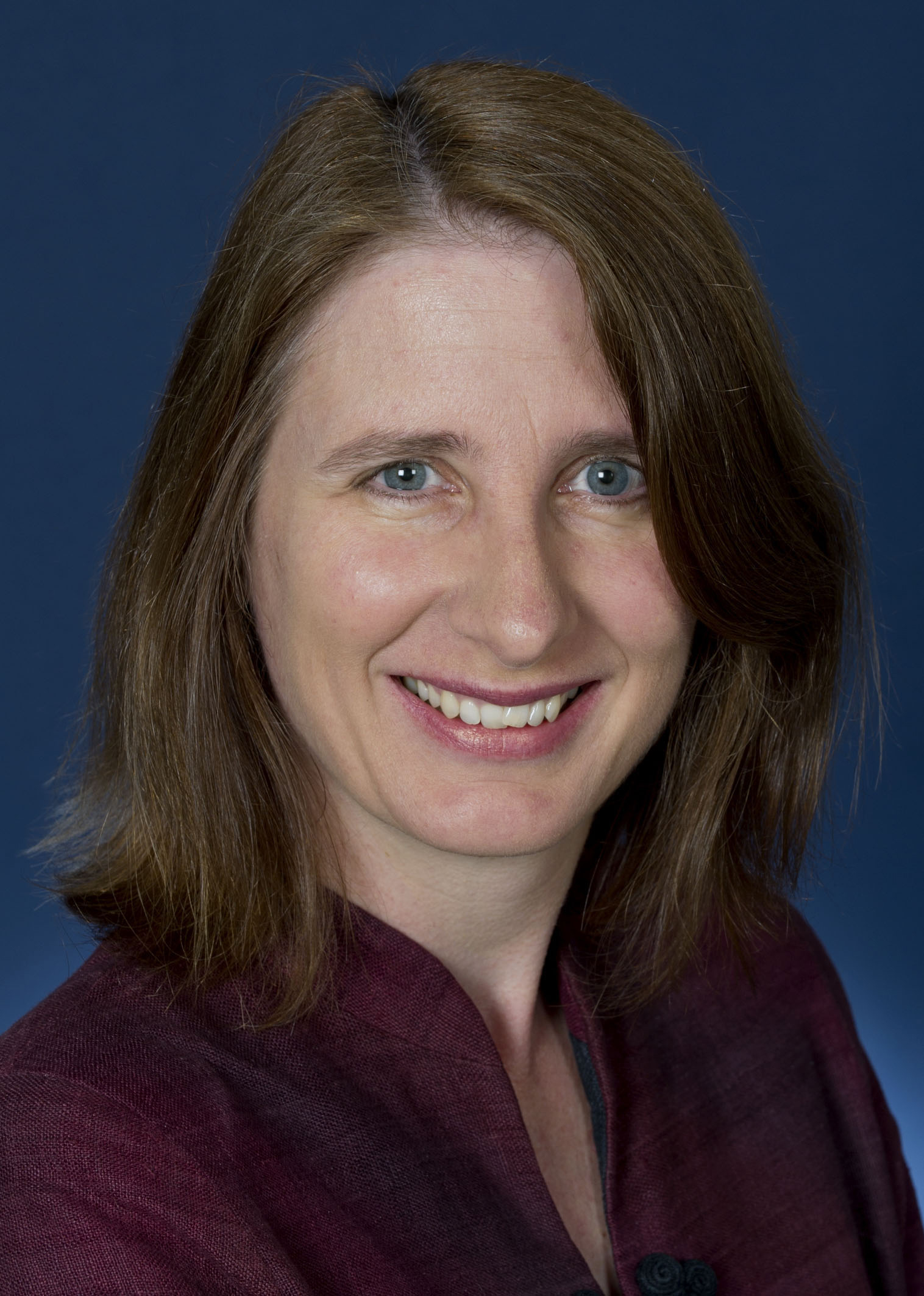
- Worthaisong in 2008

Australian Ambassador to Laos
- In office 2011–2014

Lynda Worthaisong is an Australian diplomat who served as Ambassador to Laos from 2011 to 2014. As of 2021 she serves as assistant secretary for the Department of Foreign Affairs and Trade on the Myanmar Taskforce.
