= Gulftainer =

Emirati port operator

- Type: Limited Liability Company
- Industry: Port Operations & Management and Transport & Logistics
- Founded: 1976
- Headquarters: Sharjah, United Arab Emirates
- Area served: United Arab Emirates, Iraq, Lebanon, Saudi Arabia, Pakistan, and the United States
- Products: Port investment, development, management and operations. Transport of all cargo types including: project cargo; Third party logistics; freight forwarding; contract logistics; container repairs and minor ship repairs
- Services: Ports and logistics management
- Revenue: US$1 billion 2017
- Parent: Crescent Enterprises
- Subsidiaries: Momentum Logistics
- Website: gulftainer.com

Gulftainer is a port operator with its corporate head office in the United Arab Emirates. It was established in 1976.

== History ==
Gulftainer was formed in 1976 to manage and operate the Sharjah Container Terminal (SCT) on behalf of the Sharjah Port Authority. Ten years later a concession was awarded to Gulftainer to manage and operate Khorfakkan Container Terminal (KCT) in Khorfakkan Port and the container terminal in Hamriyah Port, Sharjah. In 2004, Gulftainer expanded beyond the UAE, initially as a consultant to the Kuwait Port Authority. Later the same year, it inaugurated the purpose-built Sharjah Inland Container Deport (SICD) near the Sharjah–Dubai border.

Since then, it has carried out operations in South Asia, Pakistan, the Comoros Islands, Turkey, Iraq, Russia, Brazil, and Lebanon In June 2013, Gulftainer completed a major acquisition by securing the majority shareholding in Saudi Arabia's Gulf Stevedoring Contracting Company (GSCCO) almost doubling the company size. This acquisition made Gulftainer the largest port operator in the Middle East with regard to the number of terminals managed.

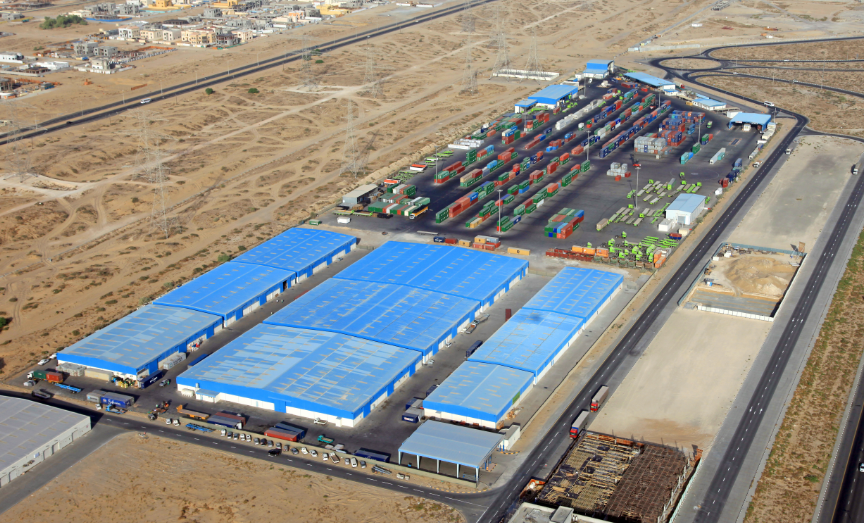
Sharjah Inland Container Depot

In June 2014, Gulftainer signed a 35–year concession with the Canaveral Port Authority in Florida, USA to operate and develop its container and multipurpose cargo terminal. The terminal, is Gulftainer's first venture in the United States. In September 2018, Gulftainer signed another contract in the US, a 50–year concession to operate the port of Wilmington, Delaware. The deal included a US$600 million investment commitment and upgrades to training facilities and terminal capabilities.

In August 2019 Gulf Stevedoring Contracting Company began operations at the King Fahad Industrial Port, Yanbu in Saudi Arabia, handling both container and breakbulk cargo.

== Operations ==
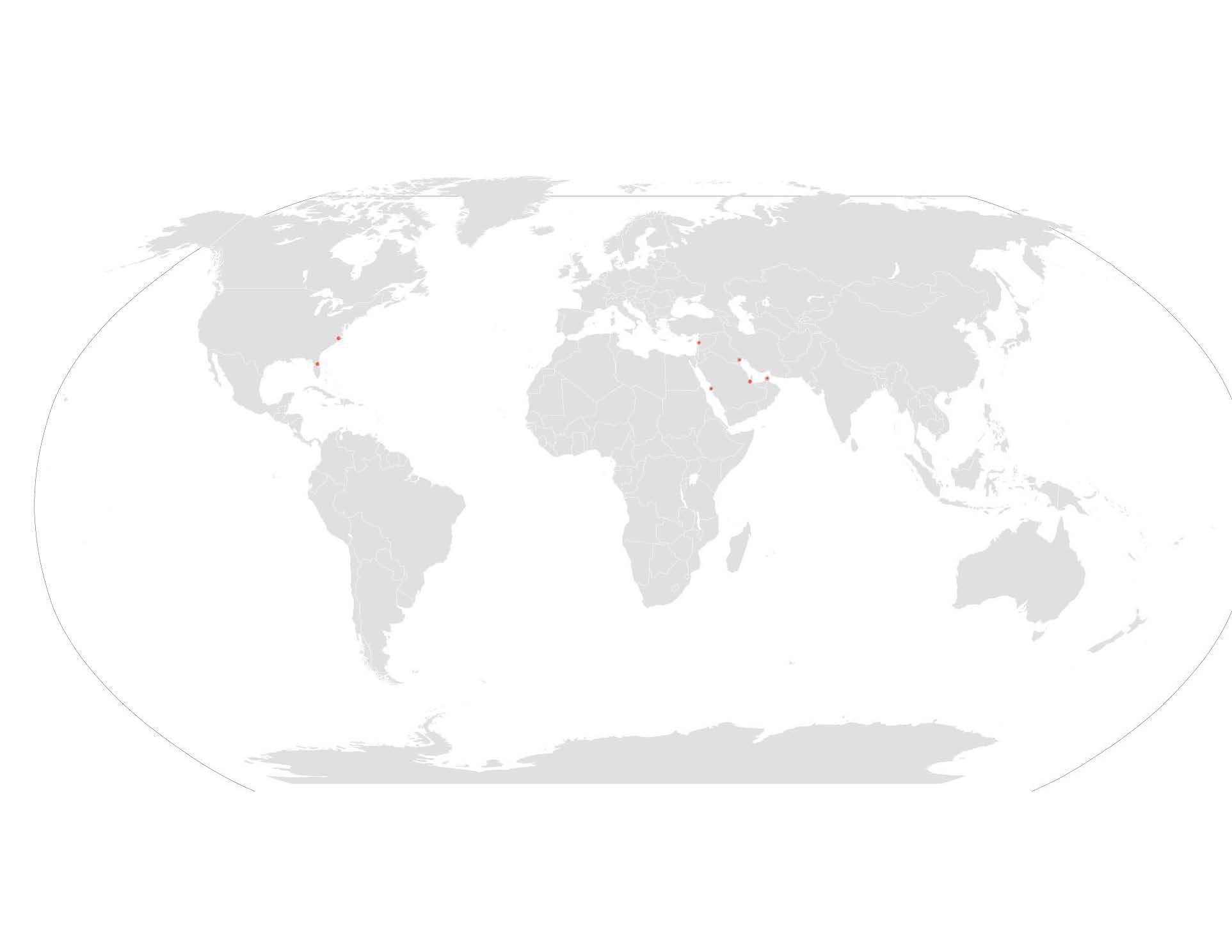
Gulftainer locations

In the UAE, Gulftainer operates three container terminals on behalf of the Sharjah Port Authority:

1. Khorfakkan Container Terminal
2. Sharjah Container Terminal
3. Hamriyah Port

Internationally, Gulftainer operates at;

1. Iraq Container Terminal and the Iraq Project Terminal at the Umm Qasr Port.
2. Jubail Commercial Port
3. King Fahad Industrial Port
4. Port of Tripoli, Lebanon
5. Port Canaveral, Florida
6. Port of Wilmington, Delaware.

The company owns and operates three logistics centres:

1. Saja'a Industrial Investment Park, Sharjah
2. Sharjah Inland Container Depot on the Dubai—Sharjah border
3. Umm Qasr Logistic Center, Iraq

== See also ==
- Crescent Enterprises
