= United Nations Democracy Fund =

Trust fund established in 2005

The United Nations Democracy Fund (UNDEF) is a United Nations trust fund created by UN Secretary-General Kofi Annan in 2005 as a means to support democratization efforts around the world. It was welcomed by the General Assembly in the Outcome Document of the 2005 World Summit (A/RES/60/1, paragraphs 136–137).

UNDEF supports projects in favor of promoting civil society, human rights, and inclusive democratic processes. The large majority of UNDEF funds go to local civil society organizations both in the transition and consolidation phases of democratization. UNDEF subsists entirely on voluntary contributions from governments.

UN Secretary-General Ban Ki-moon has said that UNDEF's focus "recognizes a fundamental truth about democracy everywhere -- that it is ultimately the product of a strong, active and vocal civil society. It is such a civil society that fosters responsible citizenship and makes democratic forms of government work."

== UNDEF support and funding ==
In 10 rounds of funding so far, UNDEF has supported over 600 projects in more than 100 countries.

UNDEF projects are two years long and fall under one or more of seven main areas;

- Women's rights and empowerment / Gender equality
- Community activism
- Rule of law and human rights
- Youth engagement
- Strengthening civil society capacity for interaction with Government
- Media and freedom of information
- Tools for knowledge

UNDEF grants range from US$100,000 to US$300,000. Project proposals are subject to a highly rigorous and competitive selection process, as UNDEF receives an average of about 2,000-3,000 proposals a year and only some 50-60 are selected.

== Funding ==
UNDEF subsists entirely on voluntary contributions from governments. in 2010, it surpassed US$110 million in cumulative contributions from 39 countries, including a wide range of non-traditional donor countries in Africa, Asia, and Latin America. In 2015, it reached almost $170 million in contributions and counted more than 40 countries as donors. Contributions to UNDEF qualify as Official Development Assistance, and several donors choose to make multi-year commitments. The United States remained the largest donor until 2026 when US President Donald Trump announced end of US support.

== Governance ==
As a Secretary-General's Trust Fund located within the United Nations Secretariat, UNDEF falls under the direct authority of the UN Secretary-General. The secretary-general is guided by the UNDEF Advisory Board, which consists of the seven biggest UNDEF donor countries—as of 2010, the United States, India, Japan, Qatar, Germany, Australia and Spain; six States from different regions, chosen for their proven commitment to democracy; two representatives of civil society organizations; and three individuals, including the chair of the board. Since 2007, the chair has been Professor Michael Doyle of Columbia University, a former UN assistant secretary-general for policy planning under secretary-General Kofi Annan. All members serve for a two-year term.

Within the UN Secretariat, the UNDEF Programme Consultative Group serves as UN inter-agency mechanism that provides expert advice, including on recommendations for project selection. It comprises the Department of Political Affairs, the Department of Peacekeeping Operations, the Office of the High Commissioner for Human Rights, the Peacebuilding Support Office, the UN Development Programme, the UN Development Fund for Women and the UN Office on Drugs and Crime.

To ensure low overheads, the UNDEF office is managed by a small team of four professionals, led (since 2007) by Roland Rich of Australia, a former diplomat and director of the Centre for Democratic Institutions at Australian National University.

== Democracy and the United Nations ==
For the UN, the importance of democracy and of democratic values was first highlighted in the United Nations Charter, as well as in the Universal Declaration of Human Rights. This in turn has been echoed in a variety of documents – declarations, conventions, covenants, most notably the Covenant on Civil and Political Rights which contains binding obligations on States Parties in respect of elections, freedom of expression and association and assembly and other vital democratic entitlements. In the 1990s, a period characterised by important changes in various parts of the world, democracy has also become a theme of a number of international conferences, and major UN organs, including the General Assembly, pronounced themselves on ways to strengthen democracy.

This process was matched by increasing operational activities in support of democratisation processes by the UN System. In particular, in 2000 the United Nations Development Programme (UNDP) placed democratic governance at the heart of its development cooperation programme, equipping itself with greater internal expertise in this area and channeling a substantial proportion of its core resources in this direction. Another significant development was the establishment in 1992 of the Electoral Assistance Division within the Department of Political Affairs.

The links between international peace and security, sustainable human development and democratization were all embraced again by the international community with the unanimous adoption of the United Nations Millennium Declaration at the Millennium Summit in 2000.

== See also ==
- Inter-Parliamentary Union
- National Endowment for Democracy
- United Nations Parliamentary Assembly
