= Mohamed bin Zayed Species Conservation Fund =

Philanthropic foundation

Mohamed Bin Zayed Species Conservation Fund
- Formation: October 2008
- Type: Charity
- Legal status: Foundation
- Purpose: Conservation
- Headquarters: Abu Dhabi, United Arab Emirates
- Official language: Arabic, English
- Donor: Mohammed bin Zayed Al Nahyan
- Key people: Razan Khalifa Al Mubarak
- Website: www.speciesconservation.org

The Mohamed Bin Zayed Species Conservation Fund is an endowment that promotes species conservation worldwide headed by Mohammed bin Zayed Al Nahyan, the current ruler of Abu Dhabi and President of United Arab Emirates. The fund was established in October 2008 and became active in January 2009. It had an initial endowment of €25 million. Proceeds from the endowment are directed to projects to conserve threatened and endangered species of animals, plants and fungi around the world. It gave more than $2.4m in 2010 to 214 projects in almost 80 countries. From 2009 to summer 2019, the MBZ Fund has supported 1,982 projects with $18.5 million across more than 150 countries.

Grant applications are submitted and managed through its website. Applications are reviewed three times per year by an independent board of advisers who make funding recommendations to the MBZ Fund's board of directors.

The MBZ Fund accepts applications for grants requesting less than $25,000 per year for projects that engage in direct boots-on-the-ground, get-your-hands-dirty species conservation. The MBZ Fund is potentially interested in applications from any country and for any species type (amphibian, bird, invertebrate, fish, fungus, mammal, plant, reptile), particularly those that are threatened but do not normally receive conservation attention.

== Conservation highlights ==
As of September 2019, the Mohamed bin Zayed Species Conservation Fund has supported 1,982 projects with $18.5 million. Over the past several years, the fund has provided an average of an additional $1.5 million each year to as many as 200 projects.

There are many examples of its grant recipients rediscovering 'lost' species including a frog species in Zimbabwe known as the Cave Squeaker (Arthroleptis troglodytes) which had not been seen in 55 years and the Cropan's tree boa (Corallus cropanii) in Brazil which had not been seen in 64 years.

Many grant recipients have discovered 'new' species including a species of wood lizard Enyalioides binzayedi was discovered through the support of the fund to the expeditions leading to the discovery of the specie in the Cordillera Azul National Park in Peru; and in 2017, a rare and majestic species of maple tree was discovered and named Acer binzayedii through the support of the fund and found in the mountainous cloud forest of Jalisco in Western México.

As of September 2019 825 grant recipients highlight their projects through case studies published on the MBZ Fund website.

== Other conservation projects ==
The MBZ Fund was selected as the executing agency for the $5.8 million Global Environment Facility–funded Dugong and Seagrass Conservation Project, a project to protect dugong and their seagrass habitats across eight countries including Madagascar, Mozambique, Sri Lanka, Malaysia, Indonesia, Timor-Leste, the Solomon Islands and Vanuatu. The project was completed in December 2018.

The MBZ Fund, in collaboration with the National Fish and Wildlife Foundation, has also supported the reintroduction of the Attwater Prairie Chicken in Oklahoma, US.

The MBZ Fund has also managed the interests of the Crown Prince of Abu Dhabi in big cat conservation through a donation to Panthera in support of its Global Alliance for Wild Cats conservation project.
