= List of ambassadors of the United Arab Emirates to the United Kingdom =

UAE Ambassador to the UK

Ambassador of United Arab Emirates to the United Kingdom
- Coat of Arms of the UAE
- Incumbent; Mansoor Abulhoul since June 14, 2019
- Ministry of Foreign Affairs
- Style: His Excellency
- Formation: 1971

The Emirati ambassador to the Court of St James's is the official representative of the Government in Abu Dhabi to the Government of the United Kingdom and Ireland.

== History ==
Relations between both countries were established in 1971, with the United Kingdom accrediting its first non-resident ambassador that year.

== List of representatives ==
Diplomatic accreditation	Ambassador	Emirati president	Monarch of the United Kingdom	Term end	Observations
1971	Mahdi Al Tajir	Zayed bin Sultan Al Nahyan	Elizabeth II	1987	
1991	Easa Saleh Al Gurg	Zayed bin Sultan Al Nahyan (1991–2004); Khalifa bin Zayed Al Nahyan (2004–2009)	Elizabeth II	2009	
2016	Sulaiman Al Mazroui	Khalifa bin Zayed Al Nahyan	Elizabeth II	2019	Previously UAE Ambassador to Belgium and headed the UAE Mission to the European Union
2019	Mansoor Abulhoul	Khalifa bin Zayed Al Nahyan (2019–2022); Mohammed bin Zayed Al Nahyan(2022-Present)	Elizabeth II (2019–2022); Charles III (2022–Present)	Incumbent	

== See also ==
- Foreign relations of the United Kingdom
- Foreign relations of the United Arab Emirates
