= Khalifa Ahmad Mubarak =

Emirati diplomat (1948–1984)

- Born: Khalifa Ahmad Abdulaziz Mubarak; 1947
- Died: 8 February 1984 (aged 36–37); Paris, France
- Cause of death: Assassination
- Years active: 1970s–1984
- Children: 4, including Khaldoon
- Awards: Legion of Honour

Khalifa Ahmad Mubarak (Arabic: خليفة أحمد مبارك; 1947–1984) was an Emirati career diplomat who was the United Arab Emirates ambassador to France from 1980 until his assassination in 1984. He was assassinated in Paris on 8 February 1984.

== Early life and education ==
Mubarak was born in 1947. He hailed from a leading merchant family. His father, Sheikh Ahmad bin Abdulaziz, helped the establishment of the UAE's judiciary system and served as the head of the UAE's Sharia Judicial Department.

Mubarak obtained a university degree in philosophy and sociology in Beirut, Lebanon.

== Career ==
Mubarak was promoted to the rank of minister plenipotentiary and became the permanent representative of the UAE to the UNESCO in Paris on 22 November 1973. During his tenure he was vice president of the Institut du Monde Arabe. He was also named as the ambassador to Sudan in 1973. Then he became the ambassador to Syria in 1976.

Mubarak was appointed the ambassador of the United Arab Emirates to France in 1980.

== Assassination ==
Mubarak was shot by a man in front of his residence on Avenue Charles Floquet in Paris on 8 February 1984. He died at Saint Anne's Hospital after the attack. The Arab Revolutionary Brigades assumed the responsibility of the murder arguing that they killed him due to the links of the UAE to American imperialism and its expulsion of Palestinians. Atef Abu Bakr, a former member of the Abu Nidal Organization (ANO), claimed in 2015 that Mubarak was murdered by the ANO.

Following the assassination of Mubarak the UAE declared a three-day mourning period.

Mubarak was succeeded by Ahmad Abdul Rahman Al Jarman as the UAE's ambassador to France.

== Personal life and awards ==
Mubarak was married and had four children, including Razan, Mohammad and Khaldoon.

== Honors ==
Mubarak was a recipient of the French award Legion of Honour.

== Legacy ==
A street in Abu Dhabi, Khalifa Al Mubarak, was named in memory of him in 2014.
