= Omar Saif Ghobash =

Emirati diplomat and author

- عمر سيف غباش
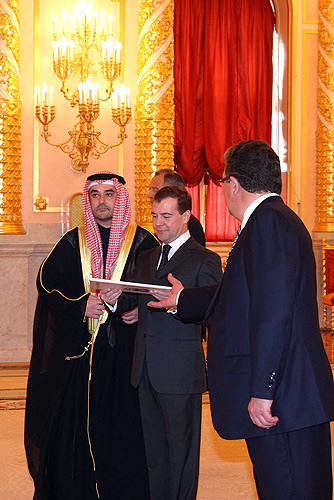
- Omar Saif Ghobash with Dmitry Medvedev

United Arab Emirates Ambassador to France
- In office 24 November 2017 – 2018
- President: Khalifa bin Zayed Al Nahyan
- Preceded by: Maadhad Hareb Al Khayeli

United Arab Emirates Ambassador to Russia
- In office 27 February 2009 – November 2017
- President: Khalifa bin Zayed Al Nahyan

Personal details
- Born: 4 June 1971 (age 55) Ras Al Kaimah, Trucial States
- Spouse: Fatima Ghobash
- Children: 2
- Parent: Saif Ghobash
- Education: Balliol College, Oxford (BA)

Omar Saif Ghobash (Arabic: عمر سيف غباش; born 4 June 1971) is the Assistant Minister for Culture and Public Diplomacy in the UAE, the UAE's Ambassador to the Holy See, and an author. He was appointed ambassador of the United Arab Emirates to France on 24 November 2017, having previously served as UAE ambassador to Russia from 2009 to 2017. Ghobash authored the book, Letters to a Young Muslim, which was written as a series of letters to his eldest son about what it means to be Muslim in the 21st century.

== Education ==
Ghobash attended Rugby School, a boarding independent school for boys in Rugby, Warwickshire. Ghobash read Law at Balliol College at the University of Oxford and graduated in 1992. Between 2003 and 2007, he studied BSc. in Pure and Applied Mathematics, in an external programme at the University of London.

== Life and career ==
Ghobash sponsors the Saif Ghobash Banipal Prize for Arabic Literary Translation, in memory of his father, Saif Ghobash, the UAE's first minister of state for foreign affairs, who was assassinated at Abu Dhabi International Airport in 1977. Likewise, he is a founding trustee of the International Prize for Arabic Fiction which runs with the support of the Booker Prize Foundation. He founded one of the region's first contemporary art galleries, The Third Line, which is based in Dubai, as well as The Arab Fund for Arts and Culture, which supports and identifies the production, research, and distribution channels of contemporary Arab art and culture.

Ghobash is on the advisory body of The International Centre for the Study of Radicalisation and Political Violence at King's College London and the Emirates Diplomatic Academy in Abu Dhabi.

Prior to his appointment as ambassador, the UAE had not had a diplomatic mission in Moscow for many years. More recently, however, the UAE has invested roughly US$6 billion in Russian infrastructure. Ghobash believes Russian participation in fighting extremism is integral to creating stability in the Middle East. A delegation from Abu Dhabi led by the UAE's Minister of Foreign Affairs, Sheikh Abdullah bin Zayed Al Nahyan, has bolstered its presence at The Kremlin in 2015 to co-produce solutions to counter terrorism and conflicts in the Middle East.

He is considered by many to be a thought leader on moderate Islam and the future of the Arab world, often calling for change through technological innovation and education in Arab countries. Regarding extremism in young Muslims, he said, "The key challenge for us is to stop treating our youth with distance, because there are recruiters out there making sure to grab those youth from us."

After receiving funding from the government of Abu Dhabi, Ghobash was involved in 2008 in discussions with John Sexton on the opening of a campus of New York University in Abu Dhabi in 2010.

Ghobash chairs the UAE Rhodes Scholarship selection committee.

== Bibliography ==
- Ghobash, Omar Saif (12 January 2017). Letters to a Young Muslim. Picador. ISBN 9781509842599.
