= Saif Ghobash =

Emirati diplomat and engineer (1932–1977)

Saif Saeed Ghobash
- سيف سعيد بن غباش

Minister of State for Foreign Affairs
- In office 25 December 1973 – 25 October 1977
- President: Zayed bin Sultan Al Nahyan
- Prime Minister: Maktoum bin Rashid Al Maktoum
- Preceded by: Position established
- Succeeded by: Rashid Abdullah Al Nuaimi

Personal details
- Born: 21 October 1932 Ras Al Khaimah, Trucial States (now United Arab Emirates)
- Died: 25 October 1977 (aged 45) Abu Dhabi, United Arab Emirates
- Children: 5 (including Omar Saif Ghobash)
- Education: Al Ahmadiya School; University of Baghdad (Engineering)
- Occupation: Diplomat; engineer

Saif Saeed Ghobash (Note: Arabic: سيف سعيد بن غباش) (21 October 1932 – 25 October 1977) was an Emirati diplomat and engineer. He was the United Arab Emirates' first Minister of State for Foreign Affairs from 25 December 1973 until his death in 1977.

Ghobash was shot and killed by a Palestinian gunman who was targeting the Syrian Foreign Minister, Abdul Halim Khaddam, in Abu Dhabi Airport in 1977.

== Early life and education ==
Born in Ras Al Khaimah, Ghobash studied at Al Ahmadiya School in Dubai before moving to Bahrain to finish his secondary education. He then studied engineering at the University of Baghdad and worked as an engineer in Kuwait and Europe. He came back to Ras Al Khaimah in 1969.

He is the father of Omar Saif Ghobash, the UAE ambassador to the Holy See.

== Diplomatic career ==
When the UAE was established in 1971, Ghobash started working as a diplomat and soon became undersecretary of the Ministry of Foreign Affairs of UAE. Two years later, he was named the first Minister of State for Foreign Affairs.

== Death ==
On 25 October 1977, Ghobash was shot and killed at Abu Dhabi International Airport by a Palestinian gunman who lived in Syria, apparently in error. An article in The New York Times quoted the Syrian Foreign Minister, Abdul Halim Khaddam, the intended target, as saying about the other gunmen that “they came from Baghdad”. At the time, Syria and Iraq were involved in constant tensions due to differences regarding the Ba'ath Socialist Party.

== Legacy ==
A hospital in Ras Al Khaimah and a road in Abu Dhabi are named after Saif Ghobash.

The Saif Ghobash–Banipal Prize for Arabic Literary Translation, also known as The Banipal Prize, is an annual prize awarded to a translator (or translators) for the published English translation of a full-length literary work in the Arabic language. The prize was inaugurated in 2006 by the literary magazine Banipal which promotes the diffusion of contemporary Arabic literature through English translations and the Banipal Trust for Arab Literature. It is administered by the Society of Authors in the UK (which runs a number of similar literary translation prizes), and the prize money is sponsored by Omar Saif Ghobash and his family in memory of Ghobash's late father Saif Ghobash.
