= Environment Agency Abu Dhabi =

Environment Agency
- هيئة البيئة

Agency overview
- Formed: 2005
- Jurisdiction: Government of Abu Dhabi

The Environment Agency – Abu Dhabi (EAD) (Arabic: هيئة البيئة - أبوظبي) is a governmental agency established in 1996 in Abu Dhabi, United Arab Emirates (UAE), tasked with environmental protection matters in the Emirate of Abu Dhabi.

== History ==
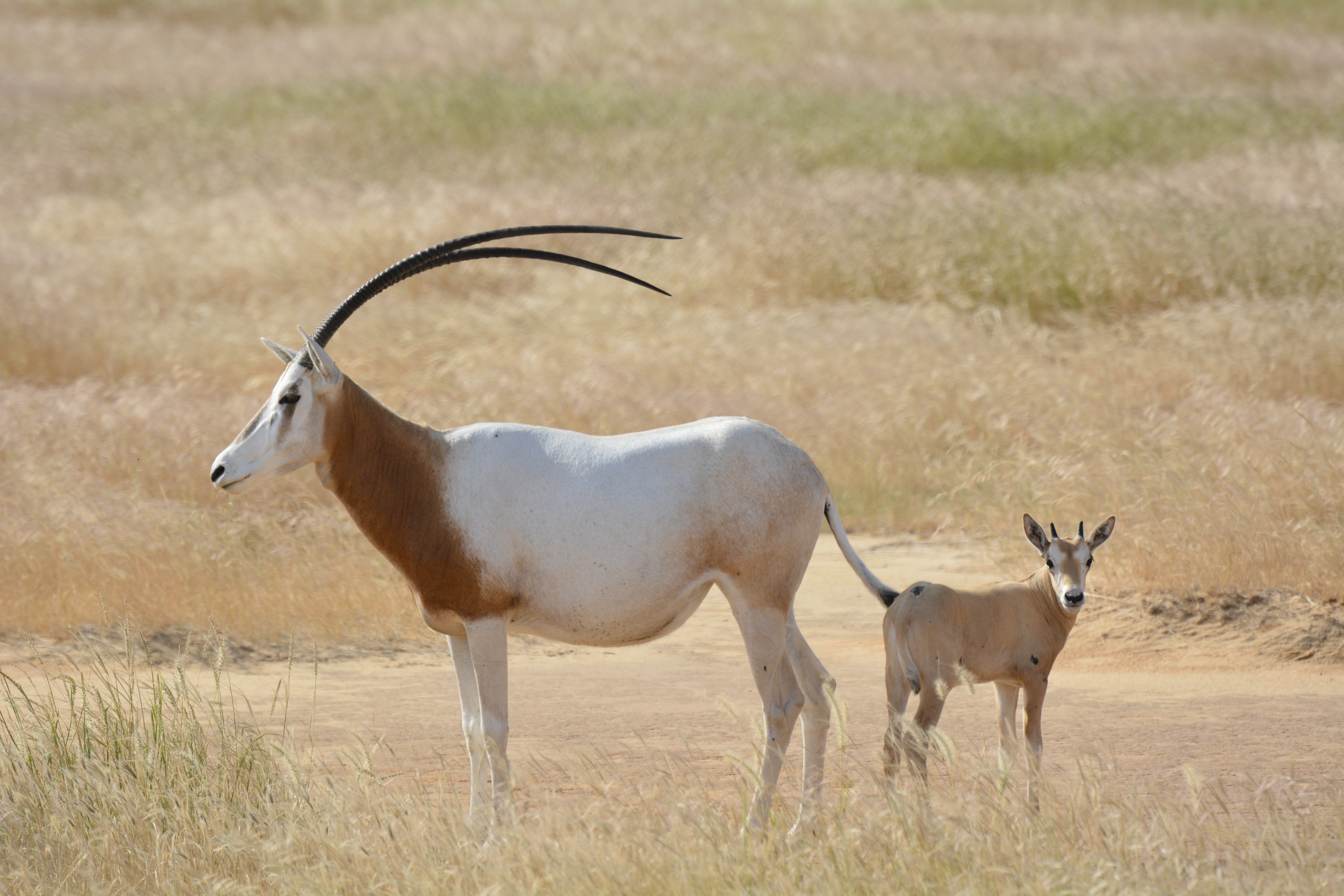
A Scimitar horned oryx was released into the wild in Chad. Pictured here is one of the first calves born in the wild after almost two decades.

In 1989, the National Avian Research Centre (NARC) was established as a conservation, research, and captive breeding organisation in Abu Dhabi. In 1996, it was renamed the Environmental Research and Wildlife Development Agency (ERWDA). In 2005, ERWDA became known as the Environment Agency – Abu Dhabi (EAD) and was chaired by the Crown Prince of the Emirate of Abu Dhabi, Sheikh Mohamed bin Zayed Al Nahyan.

The Environment Agency – Abu Dhabi (EAD) is chaired by Hamdan Bin Zayed Al Nahyan. The Vice Chairman is Mohamed Ahmed Al Bowardi. Razan Khalifa Al Mubarak is the managing director and board member. The Secretary-General is Dr.Shaikha Salem Al Dhaheri. EAD has its main headquarters in the city of Abu Dhabi, with an office in Al Ain city.

== Role and impact ==
In 2000, the Scimitar-horned oryx was officially declared extinct in the wild by the IUCN Red List. Beginning in 2016, efforts by the EAD together with the Sahara Conservation Fund, Zoological Society of London, Smithsonian Conservation Biology Institute, and the Government of Chad have successfully released 200 oryx that were bred in Abu Dhabi into the wild in Chad. In 2017, the reintroduction effort reported a number of successes including the first calves born in the wild in decades. The EAD has also undertaken a successful captive breeding program and reintroduction efforts to reintroduce the Arabian oryx back into the wild, with the population now standing at over 1,200 individuals across the Arabian Peninsula.

== Films ==
The agency has produced multiple documentaries, including:

- Back to the Wild (2018)
- Zayed's Antarctic Lights (2018)
- Our Sea. Our Heritage (2019)
- Our Sea. Our Future (2021)
- Wild Abu Dhabi: The Turtles of Al Dhafra (2021)
