= United Nations Office for Partnerships =

Body of the United Nations that oversees public-private partnerships

UN Office for Partnerships
- Abbreviation: UNOP, UNFIP, UNDEF
- Formation: March 1998
- Type: Partnerships
- Legal status: Active
- Parent organization: UN Secretariat
- Website: https://www.un.org/partnerships

The United Nations Office for Partnerships (UNOP) is a UN body established in 2006 by Secretary-General Kofi Annan to co-create partnerships within the private sector, civil society organizations, academia, and other non-state actors in furtherance of the United Nations Sustainable Development Goals.

UNOP oversees the United Nations Fund for International Partnerships (UNFIP) and the United Nations Democracy Fund (UNDEF).

== UN Fund for International Partnerships (UNFIP) ==
The United Nations Fund for International Partnerships (UNFIP) was established by Secretary-General Kofi Annan in March 1998 to serve as the interface between the United Nations system and the United Nations Foundation—the public charity responsible for administering resources in support of UN causes.

The Deputy Secretary-General is in charge of the UNFIP Advisory Board, which oversees the work of UNFIP.

== UN Democracy Fund (UNDEF) ==
The United Nations Democracy Fund (UNDEF) was established by Secretary-General Kofi Annan in July 2005 to support democratization around the world. It focuses on giving civil society a stronger voice, promoting human rights, and making sure that all groups can take part in democratic processes. Through the Fund, the Office gave money to almost 600 projects in more than 130 countries around the world. These projects ranged from helping women and young people get involved in civil society to media programs that let civil society get its message out.

=== UNDEF Priorities ===
The United Nations Democracy Fund was established during the 2005 World Summit as a United Nations General Trust Fund and launched in April 2006, with the United Nations Office for Partnerships (UNFIP) providing administrative support and resource-sharing. Since then, it has become clear that the group that gives grants is a fund for civil society organizations. It is the only United Nations entity that has the word “democracy” in its name, the only United Nations body with the primary purpose of supporting democracy through empowering civil society, and one of the youngest entities in the United Nations system. Most project money goes to local civil society groups in countries that are both in the "transition" phase of democratization and in the "consolidation" phase. By supporting the "demand" side of democratization instead of the "supply" side, the Fund plays a huge role by making a different, unique role that enhances and complements the traditional work of the United Nations, which is working with governments, to strengthen democratic governance around the world.

A key part of the Fund’s mission is to ensure that all levels of government are accountable to those they serve by increasing the knowledge, capacity, voice, and reach of citizen organizations. With the adoption of the 2030 Agenda for Sustainable Development in September 2015, the Fund agreed to give priority to projects that, among other things, hold governments accountable for meeting the Sustainable Development Goals.

== See also ==
- Millennium Development Goals
