= City Football Academy (Bolivia) =

City Football Academy, Bolivia
- Location: Santa Cruz, Bolivia
- Owner: Club Bolívar
- Operator: City Football Group
- Type: Training ground

Construction
- Groundbreaking: 2021
- Architect: Rafael Viñoly

Tenants
- Club Bolívar (academy player training); Maquina Celeste

City Football Academy, La Paz, will be the training and administrative headquarters of professional football club Club Bolívar. The City Football Group broke ground on the project in 2021. Apart from Club Bolívar, the lower-league club Maquina Celeste (Sky Blue Machine) will also play out of the facility.

== Facility ==
=== Plan and ownership ===
The facility will be the culmination of a partnership agreement between Club Bolívar and the global football organisation City Football Group. It will be the fifth City Football Academy complex constructed by City Football Group, following the academies built in Manchester, Melbourne, New York City and Montevideo. Though CFG will not own the academy, Club Bolívar have licensed them to manage it (and Bolívar's academy program) on their behalf.

Though Bolívar are based in the Bolivian capital of La Paz, in the west of the country, the new City Football Academy will be based in the eastern department of Santa Cruz.

=== Announcement ===
Bolívar's partnership with City Football Academy (CFG) was followed shortly after by the appointment as Club President of Marcelo Claure in 2021, who already had connections to CFG through his involvement in CFG club Girona FC. Announcing his appointment, Claure talked of his ambition to build a stadium and academy complex with the help of CFG. Two months later, Club Bolívar made an official announcement of the facility's creation, with work having already begun.

=== Maquina Celeste ===
In addition to the construction of the academy facilities, Club Bolívar also announced that they had signed an agreement to take control of Bolivian lower-league club Maquina Vieja, which would become a development B-team in which their academy players could be given competitive experience. As part of the deal, it was agreed that from 2022 on, the smaller club would rename itself to Maquina Celeste (Sky Blue Machine) in accordance with the kit colours of both Bolívar and City Football Group.

== See also ==
- City Football Academy (disambiguation)
- Marinos Town
