= City Football Academy (Melbourne, 2022) =

Sports venue in Cranbourne East, Victoria

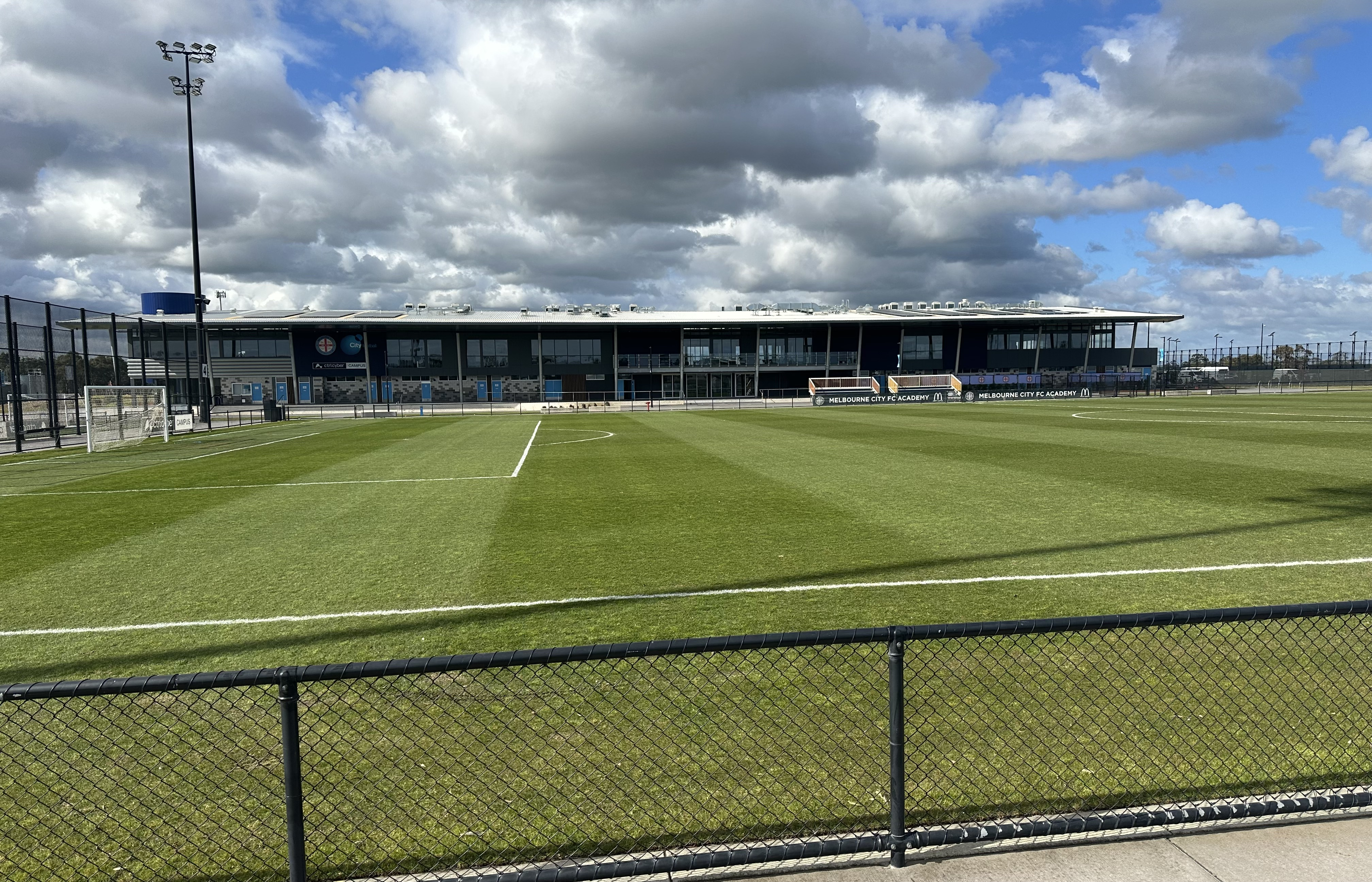
- Pitch 4 at the facility in August 2026
- Interactive map of City Football Academy
- Address: 369 Casey Fields Boulevard; Cranbourne East; Victoria, Australia
- Location: Casey Fields, Cranbourne East
- Coordinates: 38°07′27″S 145°18′34″E
- Owner: Melbourne City FC (City Football Group)
- Capacity: 1,500 (Pitch No. 4); 4,000 (Mini-stadium, proposed)
- Type: Training facility

Construction
- Groundbreaking: 2020
- Built: 2022
- Opened: 10 April 2024

Tenant
- Melbourne City Football Club

The Etihad City Football Academy, Melbourne, named after the Etihad airline and located in Melbourne, Australia, is the training and administrative headquarters of professional football club Melbourne City FC. The club was previously based in the northern Melbourne suburb of Bundoora between 2015 and 2022, and later relocated to the Casey Fields sports precinct in Cranbourne East, south-eastern suburb of Melbourne.

== Summary ==
In December 2020, Melbourne City officials announced the club would move training and administration facilities to Casey Fields in Melbourne's South-East. In 2019, the football facilities at Casey Fields included four floodlit pitches and a one-story administration building. The club announced that, in conjunction with the City of Casey, it would add an elite training tablet pitch, expand the size of the administration building to two storeys and leave space for potential future construction of a 4,000 capacity boutique stadium. The club's youth and women's teams began moving into the facility in early 2021, and the senior men's team commenced pre-season training later that year. Construction of the additional facilities commenced in July 2021. In April 2024, the redevelopment was unveiled by the club and City of Casey. The total cost of the project was $18.7 million, of which City of Casey contributed more than $11 million. As well as two and a half grass training pitches, there are three synthetic fields, 16 changerooms, a 60-seat theatrette, hot and cold hydrotherapy pools, two gyms, community classrooms, and extensive sports medicine, sports science, and administration spaces. The entire precinct covers 5,900m2.

The club's A-League Women's team has played most home matches on the Academy's main pitch, known for commercial purposes as the ctrl:cyber Pitch, since January 2024. The pitch has a spectator capacity of 1,500 with the inclusion of temporary seating.

== See also ==
- Melbourne City Football Club
- City Football Group
- Etihad Campus (Manchester)
- City Football Academy (New York)
- City Football Academy (Montevideo)
