= Melbourne City FC =

Association football club in Victoria, Australia

Melbourne City
- Full name: Melbourne City Football Club
- Nicknames: City, Hearts, Heart, City Boys, City Blues
- Founded: 12 June 2009; 17 years ago (as Melbourne Heart)
- Ground: Melbourne Rectangular Stadium
- Capacity: 30,050
- Owner: City Football Group
- Chairman: Khaldoon Al Mubarak
- Head coach: Aurelio Vidmar
- League: A-League Men
- 2025–26: 6th of 12; Finals: Elimination-finals
- Website: melbournecityfc.com.au
Home colours	Away colours	Third colours

Clubs owned by CFG Listed in order of acquisition/foundation. Bold indicates the club was founded by CFG. * indicates the club was acquired by CFG. § indicates the club is co-owned. † indicates the club is no longer owned by CFG.
2008	(England) Manchester City*
2009–2012
2013	(United States) **New York City FC**^{§}
2014	(Australia) Melbourne City*
2014	(Japan) Yokohama F. Marinos*^{†}
2015–2016
2017	(Uruguay) Montevideo City*
2017	(Spain) Girona*^{§}
2018
2019	(China) Shenzhen Peng City*^{§}
2019	(India) Mumbai City^{†}
2020	(Belgium) Lommel*
2020	(France) Troyes*
2021
2022	(Italy) Palermo*^{§}
2023	(Brazil) Bahia*^{§}

Melbourne City Football Club is an Australian professional soccer club based in the South-Eastern region of Melbourne, Victoria. They compete in the A-League Men, the highest division of soccer in Australia, under licence from the Australian Professional Leagues (APL).

Founded in 2009 as Melbourne Heart, the club competed under that name from its inaugural 2010–11 A-League season until the end of the 2013–14 season. It was rebranded as Melbourne City following its acquisition by the City Football Group (CFG) and Holding M.S. Australia in January 2014. In August 2015, CFG assumed full ownership of the club after purchasing Holding M.S. Australia's stake.

Since their formation, Melbourne City have won three A-League Men premierships, two championships and one Australia Cup (in 2016).

The club operates out of the City Football Academy, located within the Casey Fields sports precinct in Cranbourne East, a south-eastern suburb of Melbourne. Melbourne City's home matches are played at Melbourne Rectangular Stadium, known as AAMI Park for sponsorship reasons, a 30,050-seat multi-purpose venue situated in the city centre.

Melbourne City's youth team competes in both the A-Leagues Youth (last held in 2019) and in the Victorian Premier League 1 (VPL1), the second tier of football in Victoria. Additionally, Melbourne City Women compete in the A-League Women.

== History ==
=== 2009–2014: Foundation and Melbourne Heart era ===
After the dissolution of the National Soccer League in 2003, brought about by the Crawford Report, plans were drawn up for a new revamped national competition to begin the following season. Despite the calls for the new competition to feature two clubs from Melbourne, in 2004 Football Federation Australia, opting for a "one city, one team" policy, announced that the Melbourne Victory had won the licence to be the only Melbourne club to compete in the new national competition, known as the A-League. A 5-year moratorium was also established preventing any other expansion sides from the eight original A-League teams' areas entering the competition until the 2010–11 season, allowing Victory five seasons to establish itself in the Melbourne market.

On 1 March 2008, former Carlton Football Club vice-president and businessman Colin DeLutis expressed his interest in a second Melbourne A-League side, with an approach to the FFA to become sole owner of the second licence with the bid name of 'Melbourne City'. FFA chief executive Ben Buckley raised the possibility of expanding the A-League from eight to 12 teams in May 2008, in readiness for the 2009–10 season. Buckley also revealed the existence of a third Melbourne bid tentatively known as 'Melbourne Heart' backed by Peter Sidwell, to compete with the two other bids of Southern Cross FC and Melbourne City.

On 25 July 2008, the Melbourne City bid dropped out of the bidding process leaving the Melbourne Heart and Southern Cross FC bids as the last two bids standing. By September 2008, the Melbourne Heart bid was awarded exclusive negotiating rights for the league's 11th licence, beating out the South Melbourne-backed Southern Cross FC bid. Negotiations continued until Sidwell's group was awarded the licence to join the A-League's 2010–11 season by the FFA on 12 June 2009.

Heart started its inaugural season against Central Coast Mariners on 5 August 2010, at their home ground AAMI Park, losing 1–0. The club's first ever goal was an own goal scored by Ben Kantarovski in the Heart's second league game, a 1–1 draw against Newcastle Jets. Melbourne Heart's first win was a 1–0 victory over North Queensland Fury, which came in the fifth round of their first A-League season on 4 September 2010. They contested the first ever Melbourne Derby against Melbourne Victory on 8 October 2010, and won 2–1. Heart finished their first season on equal points with Newcastle Jets, but behind on goal difference in eighth position. They failed to make it into the top six teams to reach the finals, despite sitting in sixth position for majority of the season.

After a moderately more successful second season, Melbourne Heart finished 6th on the ladder, enough to make the finals. Heart's first finals game was against Perth Glory, where they were defeated 3–0 at nib stadium. Wins over local rivals continued to occur over the following two seasons, though the club failed to finish above the bottom two places and claimed the wooden spoon in 2013/14.

=== 2014–2019: City Football Group takeover and FFA Cup triumph ===

2016 FFA Cup Final starting lineup Melbourne City 1 – 0 Sydney FC

It was announced on 23 January 2014 that the City Football Group had acquired Melbourne Heart for $12 million. The deal involved CFG acquiring 80% of Heart, the other 20% to be held by a consortium of businessmen allied to Rugby league club Melbourne Storm. On 5 June 2014, the team obtained Spanish World Cup-winning striker David Villa on loan from New York City FC, another team owned by the City Football Group. Villa was expected to play in the A-League until New York City entered Major League Soccer in 2015. Villa played only four of an expected ten matches, scoring twice, before being recalled by New York City. Although none of the matches were won, coach John van 't Schip credited Villa with bringing attention to the new team, and it was estimated that his presence trebled the club's attendance. Ahead of the 2015–16 season, City Football Group announced it had bought out the remaining 20% share of the club held by a consortium for a $2.25 million fee, thus acquiring 100% ownership of Melbourne City Football Club.

Under manager John van 't Schip, the club developed a reputation for attacking and high-scoring soccer, with the 2015/16 season characterised as the club's most sustained period of on-field success. The signing of Uruguayan striker Bruno Fornaroli was key to the club becoming the most attacking and (scoring wise) prolific team in the league that season. The senior team finished the regular season a club high fourth on the table whilst the women's team achieved a remarkable feat by winning all 14 of its regular season games on the way to both a maiden premiership and championship in the club's inaugural season in the women's league. The men's team qualified for its first final of any kind in November 2016, and achieved silverware when it defeated Sydney FC 1–0 in the 2016 FFA Cup Final. Despite this success, City continued to fall short in knockout finals matches, losing at the elimination or semi-finals stage of the series over successive seasons. van 't Schip left the club mid-way through the 2016/17 season to be with his terminally ill father and under the temporary stewardship of Michael Valkanis the season ended with another early finals exit.

Following van 't Schip's departure, City management signed former Manchester United Reserves and Wigan Athletic coach Warren Joyce as manager ahead of the 2017/18 season. Despite overseeing improvements in the team's defensive capabilities, Joyce was unable to bring any silverware to the club. He left the club at the end of the 2018/19 season, in which the club again failed to reach the grand final, though with a respectable winning percentage. Fairfax soccer journalist Michael Lynch reported that, despite shoring up the team defensively, Joyce's "two years in charge will be remembered for the number of high-profile players who departed the club" under his watch, which included a falling-out with star striker Fornaroli, as well as the departures of Neil Kilkenny, Fernando Brandán and Australia's leading goalscorer Tim Cahill.

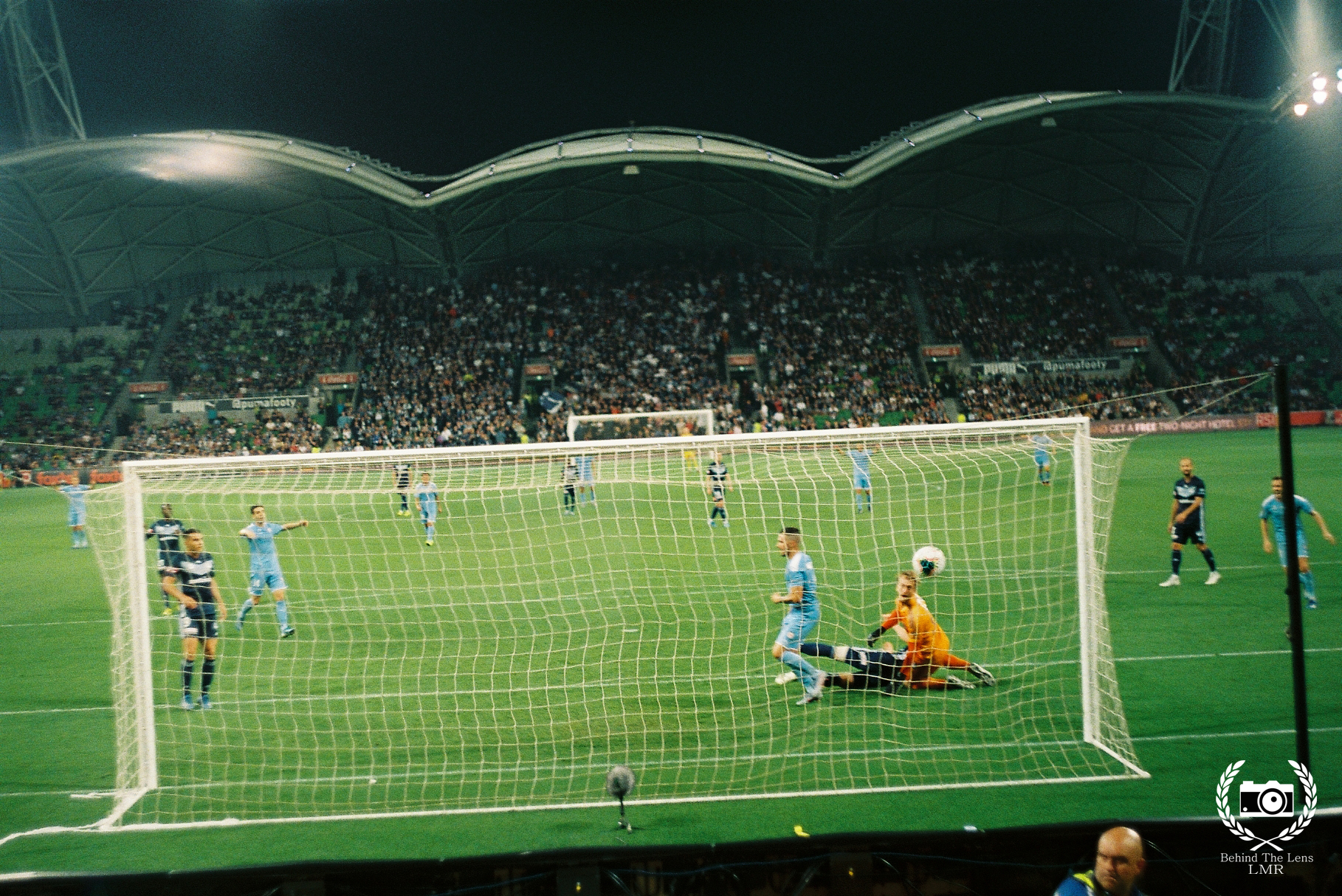
Jamie Maclaren scoring for City in the 32nd Melbourne Derby.

=== 2019–present: Grand final appearances and maiden league double ===
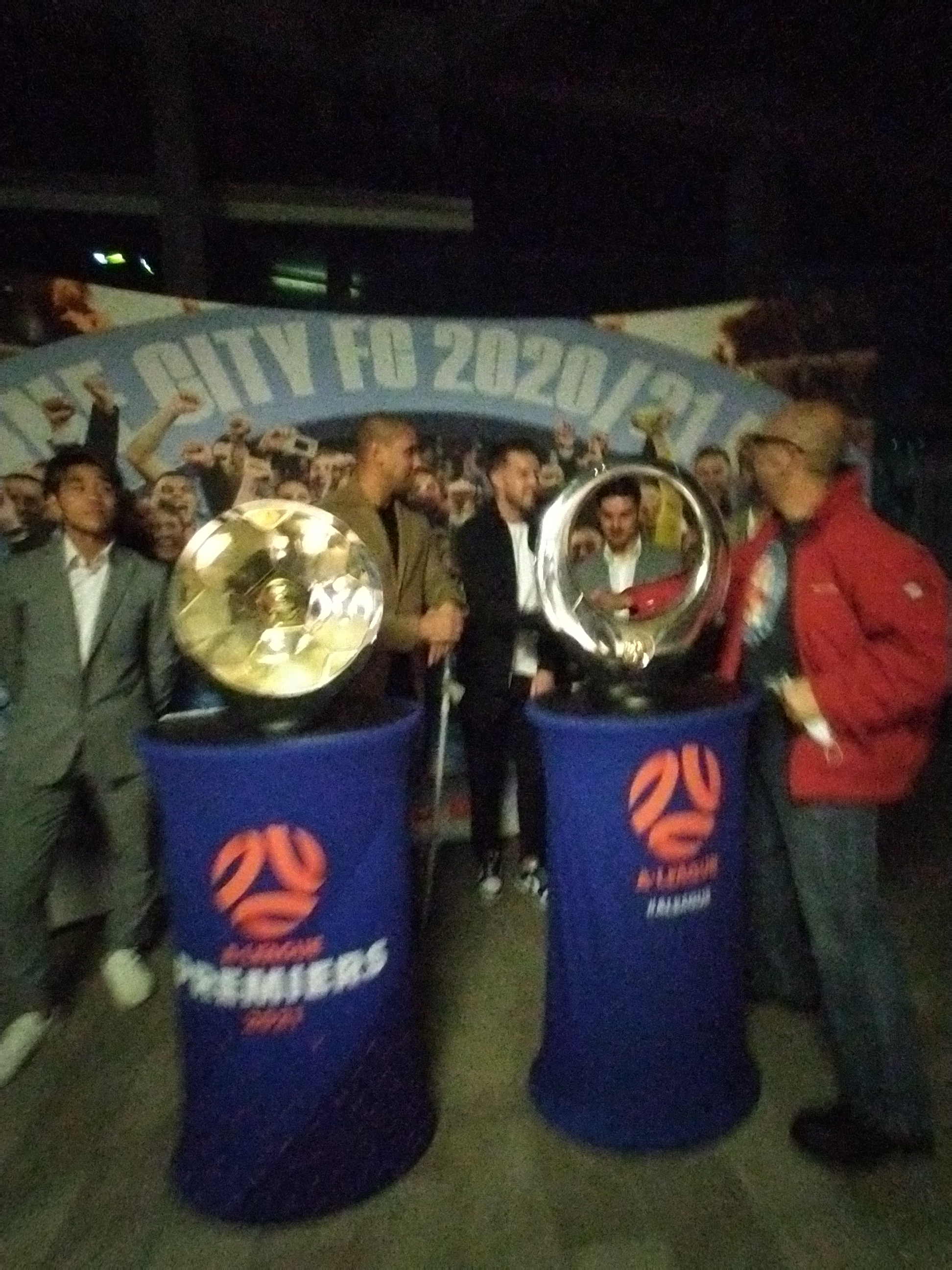
Melbourne City celebrating their 2020–21 A-League Premiership and Championship trophies at Federation Square

The club appointed Frenchman Erick Mombaerts as manager ahead of the 2019–20 season, and further changes to the playing list occurred. Internationals Florin Berenguer, Adrián Luna and Craig Noone were brought into the squad to add some attacking spark and former Hibernan and Brisbane Roar striker Jamie Maclaren was signed as the club's marquee striker. Under Mombaerts City reached their second FFA Cup Final, though they were convincingly defeated 4–0 by the home team Adelaide United. The team rebounded from that loss to finish the season with its highest ever finish of second place, with 47 points. Maclaren won the Golden Boot award with 22 goals and the club qualified for its first ever grand final by defeating local rivals Western United, though were defeated 1–0 by the home team Sydney FC in extra time. Mombaerts left the club in September 2020 and was replaced by his former assistant, Patrick Kisnorbo. Under Kisnorbo, City had a record-breaking 2020–21 season by claiming the club's first A-League premiership, three games out from the end of the regular season. After winning the club's first A-League Premiership, Kisnorbo then guided a relatively youthful City side through the A-League finals series without several key stars to win the 2020–21 A-League Championship, beating Sydney FC 3–1. The club qualified for its inaugural AFC Champions League appearance in 2022, and despite going undefeated they fell short of qualifying for the knockout stages. They rebounded to claim its second consecutive league premiership on the final day of the 2021/22 regular season, before being defeated by local rivals Western United in the grand final at AAMI Park. The club several personnel changes for the 2022/23 season and went on to claim its third consecutive premiership, becoming the first club in Australian domestic league history to achieve the feat, and second club for finishing 1st in three consecutive seasons. They lost their fourth grand final to the Central Coast Mariners. The club qualified for the finals series in sixth place in the 2023/24 season, and were defeated in the elimination final.

City finished the 2024/25 season in second place, behind newcomers Auckland FC, and in so doing they ensured qualification for the 2025/26 AFC Champions League Elite tournament. The club comfortably defeated Western United in the two-legged semi-final to reach their fifth grand final in six seasons, against derby rivals Melbourne Victory. In a tense encounter, attacking midfielder Yonatan Cohen scored the only goal of the match in the 10th minute, to record City's second men's championship.

== Name, colours and badge ==
Melbourne Heart logo (2009–2014)

=== Naming of Melbourne Heart ===
Melbourne Heart's first home kit

In October 2009, an online competition held by Melbourne's Herald Sun gave the public the opportunity to submit their preferences for the name of the new Melbourne team. The preferred names were released on the Herald Sun website on 13 November 2009. The four options were 'Sporting Melbourne FC', 'Melburnians', 'Melbourne Revolution' and 'Melbourne Heart FC'. Some pondered if 'Revolution' had some context considering its intimation to the Eureka Stockade, the closest Australia had come to revolution.

The name of the new club was to be announced before the end of 2009, but was delayed until early 2010 due to Melbourne Football Club objections to the use of the words Melbourne, Football and Club in the name. The Lord Mayor's Charitable Foundation expressed concern that the name Melbourne Heart was too similar to its annual Heart of Melbourne Appeal, and lodged a protest with IP Australia in January 2010. The club's badge was lodged to IP Australia the same month by the FFA, and on 2 February 2010, the name of the club was announced as Melbourne Heart FC.

Initially, a colour scheme of either black and white, or red and white were the two options for the club. The eventual choice for the home kit was a red and white striped jersey with red shorts and red socks, the away kit was a red sash on white jersey, with white shorts and socks.

For the 2011–12 season Melbourne Heart introduced a third kit which would be worn for one match per season. The design of the kit for each season was determined via a fan-designed competition. All fans could enter a design submission with the final design being decided by a club panel. The winner for the 2011–12 season was Red and White Unite co-founder Steven Forbes and featured a red and white sash on a grey jersey. The 2012–13 winning third kit design had a black and charcoal hoops jersey with red sleeves. The 2013–14 winning third kit design had a red and white chequered jersey with red sleeves.

=== Name change to Melbourne City ===
After the announcement in January 2014 of a takeover of Melbourne Heart by the City Football Group, there was much speculation in the media about a potential re-brand of the club including a change of kit colour to sky blue. An application to trademark the name "Melbourne City Football Club" was lodged on 16 January, and Melbourne Heart's minority shareholders had registered the business name "Melbourne City FC" with the Australian Securities and Investments Commission (ASIC). However, there was no official statement from the club for some months, leaving fans in limbo as to the future identity of the club.

In April 2014, media outlets reported that Melbourne Heart had lodged an application with Football Federation Australia (FFA) to rebrand the club similar to that of Manchester City, including a change of their playing strip from red and white to sky blue. It was reported that Sydney FC had lodged a formal complaint with FFA to block the proposed colour change. Sydney FC chairman Scott Barlow commented on the issue, saying "We're extremely concerned about the proposed use of sky blue by Melbourne Heart, and we've made our concerns very clear to the FFA...in a competition with only 10 teams, the idea of two teams wearing sky blue is nonsensical especially when sky blue is so closely associated with NSW".

In May 2014, it was reported that FFA had upheld Sydney FC's objection to a colour change to sky blue. However, Melbourne Heart released a statement shortly after confirming they were in discussions with Football Federation Australia on a range of matters relating to its future plans including its playing strips, indicating the matter was not settled.

The club was formally unveiled as Melbourne City FC on 5 June 2014.

Talks between Melbourne City and the FFA resumed in early 2016, and continued for a number of months—but finally, in June, the FFA announced an upcoming overhaul of the league's branding in the 2017–18 season, a commitment which allowed Melbourne City to update its brand and true primary colours by the start of the 2017–18 season. The changes will "allow for the full integration of the City Football Group’s playing strip colours" in the home kit, with the FFA Board saying "Sydney FC will retain exclusivity of its 'Sky Blue' brand as Melbourne City adopts the 'City Blue' colours."

The name change also resulted in a legal dispute with Victorian State League club Melbourne City FC.

=== Kits ===
Melbourne City's current home kit, in use since the 2017/18 season, is all-sky blue (officially referred to by the club as "city blue"). The home kit shorts and socks are the same colour, though in the past these have been white. For many years the club utilised a red and white striped design for their away kit, though this was altered to a white zebra-shaped design with black shorts and socks ahead of the 2019/20 season. The red and white-striped design is currently the club's Away kit in the 22-23Season . City wore an all-black third kit in the 2018/19 season.

Between 2014 and 2016, Melbourne City wore a mostly all-white home kit, which featured a vertical light and navy blue strip running down the right side of the kit. In the 2016/17 season, the home kit was again predominately white though the vertical strip was removed and was replaced with light blue sleeves and collar.

The away kit during the 2014/15 and 2015/16 seasons used a similar design to the traditional Melbourne Heart kits, with vertical red and white stripes strewn across. It was announced that "the away kit celebrates the club's history, the wishes of its existing fan base and the red and white that remains at the Heart of its identity. The away strip was changed to a horizontal white/red gradient in 2016/17, with the club's statement being "the kit .. displays the Club’s traditional red and white colours – a key feature of the Club’s badge".

Despite the unprecedented success City Football Group (CFG) has brought to Melbourne City, many fans were uneasy about the transition from Heart to City in 2014, especially in the perceived abandoning of the club's traditional red and white colours. Some of the concerns were abated by the inclusion of red in the Supporters Scarves for the 2015–16 A-League season, and through the design of the club's away kits, which in most seasons since the CFG takeover have commemorated the club's traditional colours, red and white.

== Sponsorship ==
Melbourne City's branding and sponsorship arrangements usually tie in with sister clubs in the City Football Group. Upon the takeover by CFG, the club's kits were supplied by Nike and it was sponsored by Abu Dhabi-based airline Etihad Airways. The Etihad sponsorship has remained though in 2019 the club's kit suppliers changed to German-based brand Puma, a deal in place for five years.

In the pre-CFG days, Melbourne Heart's foundation sponsor was financial institution Westpac for a three-year agreement believed to be worth close to $2 million, which allowed the institution's logo to be present on home and away Heart kits. Drake International, Public Transport Victoria and BDO were the other major sponsors of the club. The club signed a two-year deal with kit supplier Kappa in May 2012.

Period	Kit manufacturer	Front shirt sponsor	Back shirt sponsor	Sleeve sponsor	Front short sponsor	Back short sponsor
2010–2011	Reebok	Westpac	PKF	Drake International	Metlink	Solo
2011–2012*	ISC	Westpac	PKF	Drake International	Metlink	Solo
2012–2013*	Kappa	Westpac	BDO International	AXF Group (Home) MatchWorks (Away)	PTV	Foxtel
2013–2014*	Kappa	Westpac	Alcatel onetouch	AXF Group (Home) MatchWorks (Away)	Diabetes College	Foxtel
2014	Nike	Etihad	Hostplus	CoCo Joy (Home) MatchWorks (Away)	Westpac	Foxtel
2015–2018	Nike	Etihad	Hostplus	CoCo Joy (Home) MatchWorks (Away)	Westpac	Foxtel
2019–	Puma	Etihad	Hostplus	CoCo Joy (Home) MatchWorks (Away)	Origin Energy	Foxtel
2019–	Puma	Etihad	Hostplus	Nissan	Origin Energy	My Republic

=== AFC Competition Sponsorship ===
Year	Kit Manufacturer	Shirt Sponsor
2022	Puma	Etihad
2023-24	Puma	Etihad

== Stadium ==
Melbourne City's home ground is Melbourne Rectangular Stadium. Melbourne City's largest average season attendance is 11,047 (achieved in the 2015–16 season), while the largest ever attendance for a single home match is 26,457 against Melbourne Victory in round 12 of the 2012–13 A-League season.

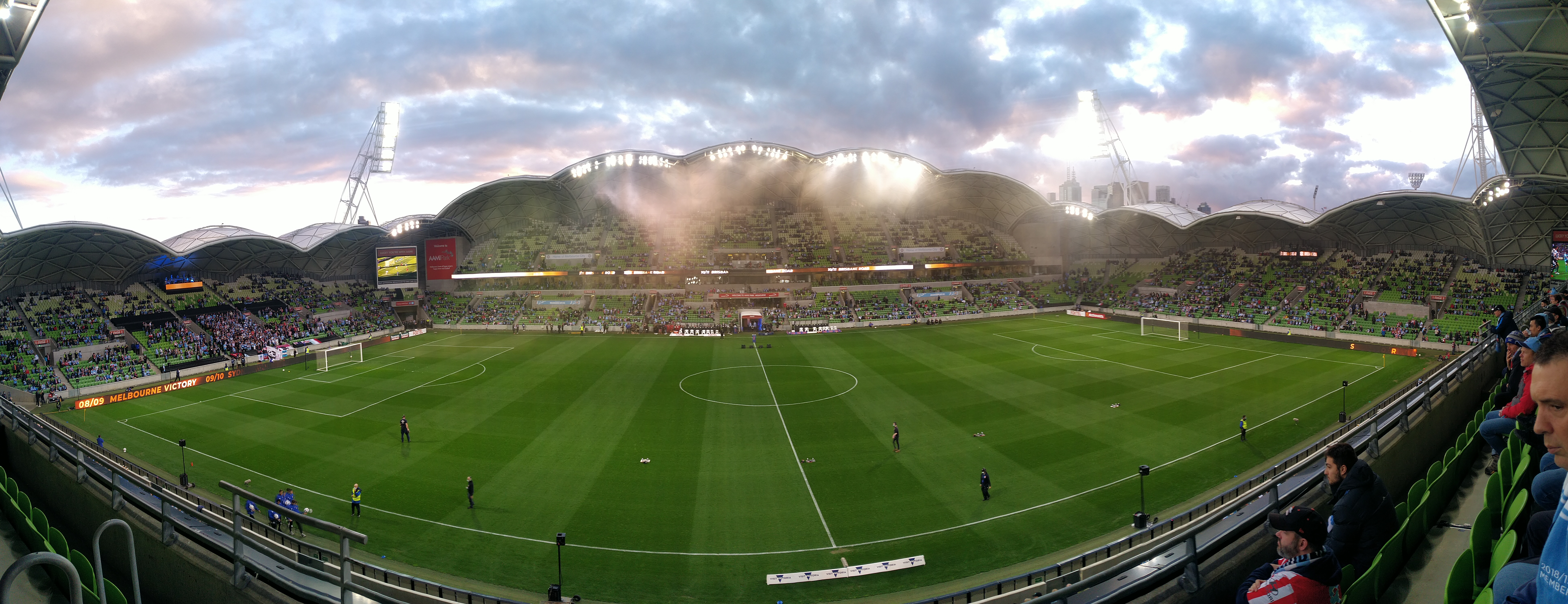
A panorama of AAMI Park prior to the 2021 A-League Grand Final.

== Statistics and records ==
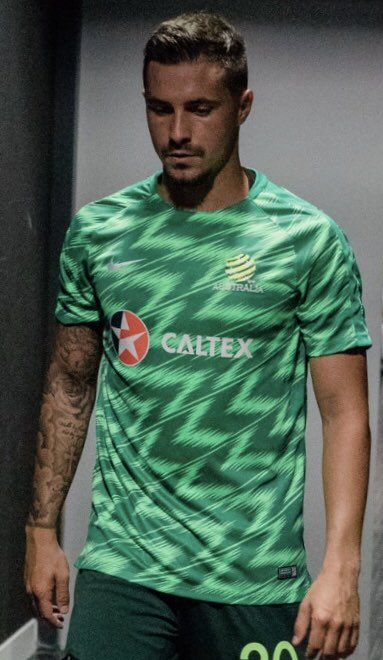
Jamie Maclaren is Melbourne City's record goalscorer, with 95 goals in all competitions.

Current defender Curtis Good holds the record for Melbourne City appearances, having played 162 first-team matches. Scott Jamieson comes second, having played 161 times between 2017 and 2021. The record for a goalkeeper is held by Tom Glover, with 79 appearances.

Jamie Maclaren is the club's top goalscorer with 109 goals in all competitions from 2019 to the present day, having surpassed Bruno Fornaroli's total of 57 in May 2021. Maclaren also holds the club record for goals scored in the League, with 97.

Melbourne City's record home attendance is 29,902, recorded during the A-League Men Grand Final win against Melbourne Victory on 31 May 2025 at Melbourne Rectangular Stadium.

Melbourne City's 2016–17 squad was the most expensive team in Australian soccer history, with team wages totalling $9.15 million.

== Players ==
=== First-team squad ===
As of 1 October 2026

Note: Flags indicate national team as defined under FIFA eligibility rules; some limited exceptions apply. Players may hold more than one non-FIFA nationality.

No.	Pos.	Nation	Player
1	GK	AUS	Macklin Freke
2	DF	AUS	Harrison Delbridge
4	DF	AUS	Liam Bonetig
5	MF	BRA	Matheus Rossetto (on loan from Fortaleza)
7	FW	AUS	Mathew Leckie
9	FW	AUS	Max Caputo
10	MF	DEN	Emiliano Marcondes
11	FW	AUS	Awer Mabil
13	DF	AUS	Nathaniel Atkinson
14	DF	AUS	Besian Kutleshi
15	FW	AUS	Andrew Nabbout
16	DF	AUS	Aziz Behich (captain)
18	DF	CRC	Julio Cascante
19	MF	AUS	Quinn MacNicol
20	FW	AUS	Benjamin Mazzeo

No.	Pos.	Nation	Player
21	MF	AUS	Alessandro Lopane
22	DF	AUS	Peter Antoniou (scholarship)
23	FW	AUS	Medin Memeti
24	MF	AUS	Kavian Rahmani
26	DF	AUS	Ryan Kalms
34	DF	AUS	Jayden Necovski (scholarship)
36	DF	IDN	Mathew Baker
37	FW	AUS	Akeem Gerald
38	MF	AUS	Beckham Baker
39	FW	AUS	Roland Ballah
40	GK	AUS	James Nieuwenhuizen
41	MF	AUS	Lawrence Wong (scholarship)
42	GK	AUS	Lachlan Charles
77	FW	JPN	Takeshi Kanamori
—	MF	AUS	Luka Demuth

==== Youth ====
Players to have featured in a first-team matchday squad for Melbourne City.

Note: Flags indicate national team as defined under FIFA eligibility rules; some limited exceptions apply. Players may hold more than one non-FIFA nationality.

No.	Pos.	Nation	Player
43	MF	AUS	Angus Mackintosh
44	DF	AUS	Isiah Boston

No.	Pos.	Nation	Player
50	GK	AUS	Jonty Benfield

==== On loan ====
Note: Flags indicate national team as defined under FIFA eligibility rules; some limited exceptions apply. Players may hold more than one non-FIFA nationality.

No.	Pos.	Nation	Player

== Personnel ==
The club's current manager is Aurelio Vidmar. The club's previous manager was Rado Vidošić, who departed the club in 2023. There have been seven permanent managers of Melbourne City since the appointment of the club's first professional manager, John van 't Schip in 2009. The club's longest-serving manager, in terms of both length of tenure and number of games overseen, is John van't Schip, who managed the club between 2013 and 2017.

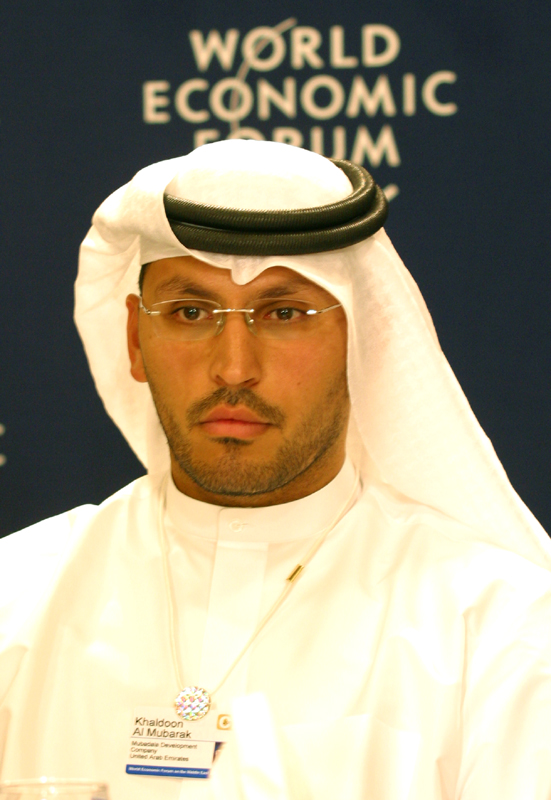
Chairman Khaldoon Al Mubarak

=== Corporate management ===
Position	Name
Owners	City Football Group
Chairman	(United Arab Emirates) Khaldoon Al Mubarak
Chief Executive Officer	(Australia) Brad Rowse
Football Operations Manager	(Australia) Michael Petrillo

=== Team management ===
Position	Name
Head coach	(Australia) Aurelio Vidmar
Assistant coach	(Australia) Scott Jamieson
Assistant coach	(Czech Republic) Petr Krátký
Goalkeeping coach	(Netherlands) Sander Krabbendam
Technical director	(France) Alain Fiard
Head of Human Performance	(Australia) Andrew McKenzie
Football Logistics Manager	(Australia) Josh Bondin

== Club captains ==
Dates	Name	Notes	Honours (as captain)
2010–2011	(Australia) Simon Colosimo	Inaugural club captain	
2011–2013	(Brazil) Fred	First foreign captain	
2013–2014	(Australia) Harry Kewell		
2014–2016	(Australia) Patrick Kisnorbo		
2016–2018	(Uruguay) Bruno Fornaroli		2016 FFA Cup
2018–2023	(Australia) Scott Jamieson		2020–21 A-League Premiership; 2020–21 A-League Championship; 2021–22 A-League Premiership; 2022–23 A-League Premiership
2023–2024	(Australia) Jamie Maclaren		
2024–	(Australia) Aziz Behich		2024–25 A-League Men Championship

== Honours ==
=== Domestic ===
Chart of yearly table positions for Melbourne City in A-League Men

- **A-League Men** Championship
  - Winners (2): 2021, 2025
  - Runners-up (3): 2020, 2022, 2023
- **A-League Men** Premiership
  - Winners (3): 2020–21, 2021–22, 2022–23
  - Runners-up (2): 2019–20, 2024–25
- **Australia Cup**
  - Winners (1): 2016
  - Runners-up (1): 2019

== Continental record ==
Season	Competition	Round	Club	Home	Away	Aggregate
2022	AFC Champions League	Group G (Note: All group-stage games were played in a centralized venue in Thailand due to the COVID-19 pandemic.)	(Thailand) BG Pathum United	0–0	1–1	2nd out of 4
2022	AFC Champions League	Group G	(Philippines) United City	3–0	3–0	2nd out of 4
2022	AFC Champions League	Group G	(South Korea) Jeonnam Dragons	2–1	1–1	2nd out of 4
2023–24	AFC Champions League	Group H	(Japan) Ventforet Kofu	0–0	3–3	2nd out of 4
2023–24	AFC Champions League	Group H	(China) Zhejiang	1–1	2–1	2nd out of 4
2023–24	AFC Champions League	Group H	(Thailand) Buriram United	0–1	2–0	2nd out of 4
2025–26	AFC Champions League Elite	League stage	(Japan) Sanfrecce Hiroshima	0–2	—N/a	5th out of 12
2025–26	AFC Champions League Elite	League stage	(Japan) Vissel Kobe	—N/a	0–1	5th out of 12
2025–26	AFC Champions League Elite	League stage	(Thailand) Buriram United	2–1	—N/a	5th out of 12
2025–26	AFC Champions League Elite	League stage	(Japan) Machida Zelvia	—N/a	2–1	5th out of 12
2025–26	AFC Champions League Elite	League stage	(Malaysia) Johor Darul Ta'zim	2–0	—N/a	5th out of 12
2025–26	AFC Champions League Elite	League stage	(South Korea) FC Seoul	—N/a	1–1	5th out of 12
2025–26	AFC Champions League Elite	League stage	(South Korea) Ulsan HD	—N/a	2–1	5th out of 12
2025–26	AFC Champions League Elite	League stage	(South Korea) Gangwon FC	0–0	—N/a	5th out of 12
2025–26	AFC Champions League Elite	Round of 16	(Thailand) Buriram United	1–1	0–0 (a.e.t.) (2–4 p)	1–1 (a.e.t.) (2–4 p)

== Melbourne City Women ==
Melbourne City Women was founded in 13 May 2015 and is the women's soccer club affiliated to Melbourne City. They are one of the two most successful teams in the A-League Women alongside interstate rivals, Sydney FC - both have won five premierships and five championships. Since their debut in the then-named, W-League, Melbourne City have won a record-breaking three consecutive championships in 2016, 2017 and 2018, with a fourth in 2020, and a fifth in 2025-26. Their five premierships occurred in 2015–16, 2019–20, 2023–24, 2024–25 and 2025–26.

== Club facilities ==
For the first five years of their existence, Melbourne City trained on borrowed accommodation at La Trobe University, operating under a partnership with the local educational body. The site was chosen due to its ability to house both the administrative and training arms of the club as well as provide ample access to various support services, including conditioning and medical facilities. The club's training facilities were notably low quality and rudimentary, with players responsible for carting goal nets from one side of the La Trobe University playing fields to the other, players utilising wheelie bins filled with ice instead of ice baths, and a Portacabin adjacent to the pitches was utilised as a medical and massage room.

Following the acquisition of the club by City Football Group, Melbourne City paid $15m to construct for themselves a brand new training and administrative facilities on additional land leased adjacent to the La Trobe University precinct in the northern Melbourne suburb of Bundoora, designed to a world class level. At the completion of the project, the new centre was dubbed the "City Football Academy" following the naming conventions established at the affiliated Manchester complex.

In December 2020, Melbourne City officials announced the club would move its training and administration facilities to Casey Fields, Cranbourne East, in Melbourne's South-East. In 2019 the football facilities at Casey Fields included four floodlit pitches and a one-story administration building. The club announced that, in conjunction with the City of Casey, it would add an elite training tablet pitch, expand the size of the administration building to two storeys and leave space for potential future construction of a 4,000 capacity boutique stadium. The club's youth and women's teams will begin moving into the facility in 2021, with the entire club to be based at the facility when construction is completed in 2022.

== Rivalries ==
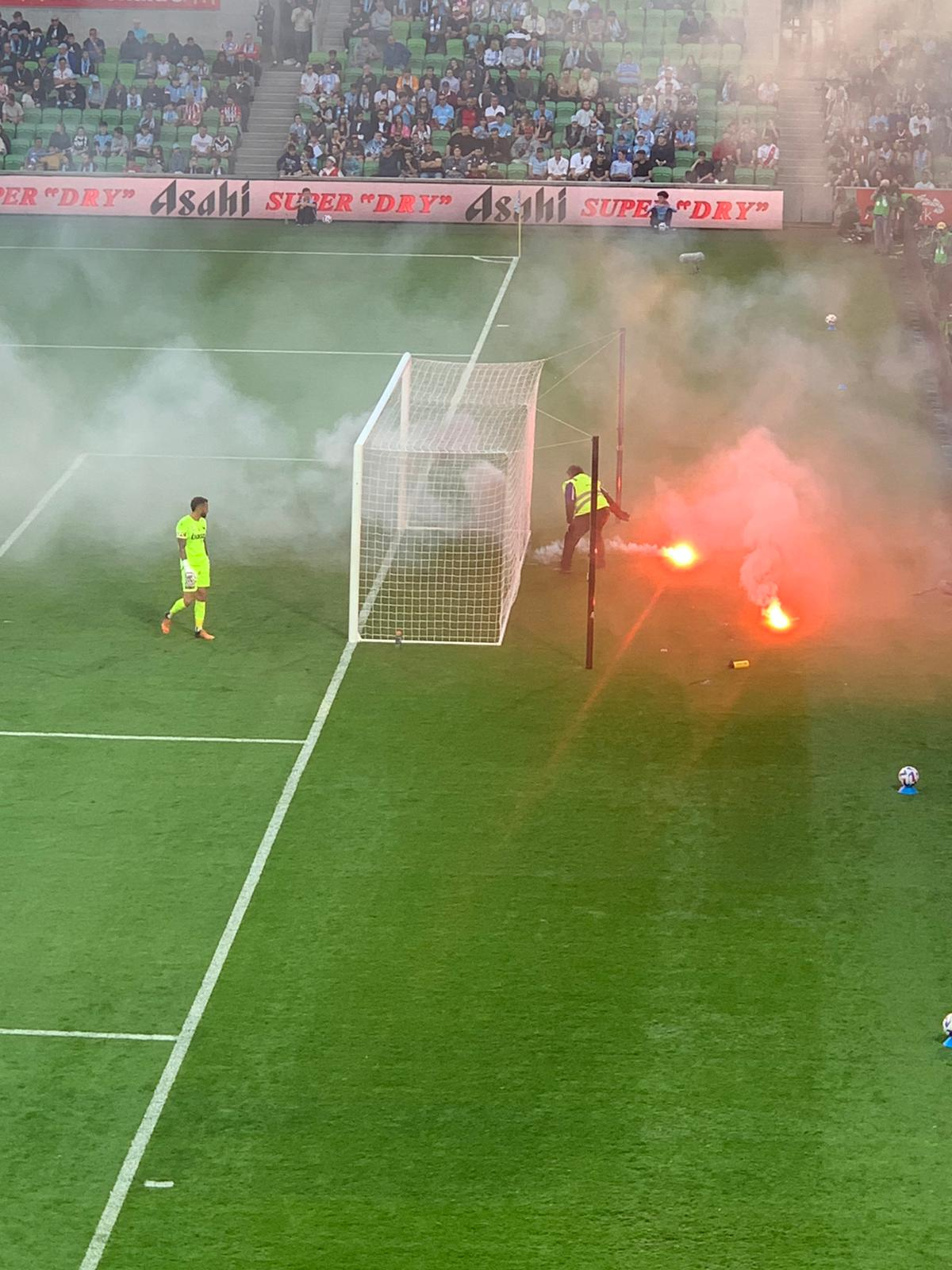
Flares thrown onto pitch during the 40th Melbourne Derby

Melbourne City's local rivals are Melbourne Victory. Although there were many state or regional rivalries in the A-league, the Melbourne Derby was the first and only intra-city derby in the league until a second Sydney-based club, Western Sydney Wanderers joined the A-League in the 2012/13 season. The first match between the two clubs saw Melbourne City (known at the time as Melbourne Heart) win 2–1 in front of a sold out AAMI Park crowd of over 25,000 spectators. The derby match between the two Melbourne clubs is often marked as an "annual spectacle" both on and off the pitch, attracting large crowds and frequently producing "enthralling" results and encounters.

The rivalry became more intense in the third meeting of the clubs on 22 January 2011, when Melbourne Victory's Kevin Muscat made a tackle on Adrian Zahra, which earned Muscat a red card and an eight-week suspension, and was the direct cause of a season-ending knee injury to Zahra. The two rivals have met in a finals series match only once, in the 2014–15 season, when City lost 0–3 to a clinical Melbourne Victory outfit. City has defeated Victory in the only FFA Cup derby held between the two clubs, City winning the semi-final match 2–0.

The 40th Melbourne Derby on 17 December 2022 was unprecedented in its volatility, with the match marred with poor crowd behaviour, including multiple flares ignited and thrown onto the pitch by supporters of both teams. In the 20th minute of the match, Melbourne City goalkeeper Tom Glover threw back a flare sent from the crowd, sparking a pitch invasion which saw both Glover and referee Alex King assaulted by pitch invaders, and causing the match to be abandoned. In response Football Australia implemented interim sanctions closing active supporter bays for both clubs for all matches up to and including 15 January 2023.

== See also ==
- Manchester City FC
- New York City FC
- Montevideo City Torque
- Mumbai City FC
- Expansion of the A-League
