= City Football Academy (Montevideo) =

City Football Academy, Montevideo
- Location: Montevideo, Uruguay
- Owner: Montevideo City Torque (City Football Group)
- Type: Training ground
- Acreage: 22.25 acres

Construction
- Groundbreaking: 10 July 2020
- Opened: 16 March 2021
- Cost: €5m
- Architect: Rafael Viñoly

Tenants
- Montevideo City Torque (Training and administration)

City Football Academy, Montevideo, is the training and administrative headquarters of professional football club Montevideo City Torque. Announced in January 2020, it became the fourth City Football Academy complex constructed by City Football Group, owner of Montevideo City Torque, after the facilities constructed in Manchester, Melbourne and New York City, and closely follows the design of its three predecessors.

The facility was officially opened on 16 March 2021, with Uruguayan President Luis Lacalle Pou presiding over the inauguration ceremony.

== Features ==
With Torque having relocated from the outskirts of Montevideo to the city centre in 2018, the club was left with no permanent stadium nor training ground or office space. On 22 January 2020, the club announced a major redesign of their image, renaming themselves from Club Atlético Torque to Montevideo City Torque and replacing their club badge to match the style of other clubs also owned by their parent company, City Football Group. Accordingly, at the same time City Football Group also announced that they would invest approximately €5m into construction of a new academy and administrative complex in Montevideo.

On 7 May 2020 the club announced that CFA Montevideo would cover 90,000 sq. metres, containing five pitches, an administrative building plus changing rooms and training facilities. It will be the first such all-in-one club facility in Uruguay.

== See also ==
- City Football Academy (disambiguation)
- Marinos Town
