= City Football Academy (Melbourne, 2015) =

Headquarters of Melbourne City Football Club

- Interactive map of City Football Academy
- Address: 44 Crissane Road; Bundoora; Victoria, Australia
- Location: La Trobe University, Bundoora, Melbourne
- Coordinates: 37°43′39″S 145°02′52″E
- Owner: Melbourne City FC (City Football Group)

Construction
- Built: 2014
- Opened: 2015
- Demolished: 2022
- Cost: $15 million AU

Tenants
- Melbourne City Football Club (Training and administration)

The Etihad City Football Academy, Melbourne, named after the Etihad airline and located in Melbourne, Australia, was the training and administrative headquarters of professional football club Melbourne City FC between 2015 and 2022. The club has been based at two of these facilities, originally at in the northern Melbourne suburb of Bundoora, and later at the Casey Fields sports precinct in Cranbourne East.

== Summary ==
City Football Group announced the construction of the facility in mid-2014, shortly after acquiring Melbourne Heart and renaming the club as Melbourne City. The site was situated within the La Trobe University precinct. Constructed in late 2014 for approximately $15 million Australian dollars, the City Football Academy has served as the Asia-Pacific base for the City Football Group company and since the opening in February 2015 has provided tenant club Melbourne City with some of the best facilities of any A-League club.

The Academy included an elite level physiotherapy, rehabilitation and medical facilities, a club administrative office and multiple football pitches including a $2 million DESSO hybrid artificial surface.

The facility was also the administrative and training hub of Melbourne City's youth team and women's team. In December 2016, the club unveiled the Elite Women's Facility, an extension of the complex providing dedicated warm-up, training, locker and lecture rooms for the women's team.

In December 2020, Melbourne City officials announced the club would move training and administration facilities to Casey Fields in Melbourne's South-East. Melbourne City subsequently moved to Casey Fields, with the Bundoora facility being demolished after Melbourne City moved out.

== See also ==
- Melbourne City Football Club
- City Football Group
- Etihad Campus (Manchester)
- City Football Academy (New York)
- City Football Academy (Montevideo)
