= City Football Academy =

City Football Academy may refer to:

- City Football Academy (Bolivia), headquarters of Club Bolivar
- City Football Academy (Durrës), Albania
- City Football Academy (Melbourne, 2015), the demolished headquarters of Melbourne City FC in Bundoora, Victoria
- City Football Academy (Melbourne, 2022), the current headquarters of Melbourne City FC at Casey Fields, Cranbourne East
- City Football Academy (Montevideo), headquarters of Montevideo City Torque in Montevideo, Uruguay
- City Football Academy (New York), headquarters of New York City FC in Orangeburg, New York
- City Football Academy (CFA) training facility, at Etihad Campus, the headquarters of Manchester City Football Club
  - Manchester City F.C. EDS and Academy, the academy of the club
