= Dyrrah City Football Academy =

Football training facility it Durrës, Albania

Durrës Sports Center
- Interactive map of Durrës Sports Center
- Location: Spitallë, Durrës, Albania
- Coordinates: 41.35508°N 19.45659°E
- Owner: Ministry of Education, Sports and Youth

Tenants
- Dyrrah City Football Academy; Dyrrah City Tennis Academy; Dyrrah City Basketball Academy

The Dyrrah City Football Academy is a football training facility under construction in Durrës, Albania, part of a planned wider multi-sports training centre called variously the Dyrrah City Sports Center or the Durrës Sports Center.

The football academy is intended to be run as a joint collaboration between three stakeholders. The organisation and the facility is owned and organised by the Dyrrah City Football Academy Foundation, which itself functions as a part of the Albanian Ministry of Education, Sports and Youth. Football training sessions are run by City Football Group, with coaching coming from a local team employed by CFG and led by staff transferred from Manchester City's youth academy in England. The final partner is Albanian Kategoria Superiore club FC Dinamo City, who arranged for and financed the construction of the physical building and will incur administrative costs in exchange for receiving profits from any future player sales.

In the long-term, the academy plans to create a senior team playing in the Albanian football league system which the DCFA will house also.

== Announcement and construction ==
On 26 April 2023, Albanian Prime Minister Edi Rama announced a partnership between the Albanian Ministry of Education and Sports with City Football Group, signing an agreement at Manchester City's City Football Academy in Manchester, England. Part of this agreement was that a City Football Academy training facility would be constructed in Durrës. Renders of the future academy's design were released on 31 August 2023.

On 11 October 2023 it was announced that the Ministry of Education and Sport had been awarded two plots of land totalling 204,350m^{2} (50.5 acres) in the Spitallë area of Durrës for the purposes of constructing the academy.

Construction work had begun by April 2025, with Edi Rama suggesting an expected opening date of September 2026.

== Football operations ==
Though construction of the facility had not yet begun, the academy itself began operations in mid-2024 and by June 2025 several representative teams had travelled to take part in different competitions in Europe and Asia.

== See also ==
- City Football Group
- City Football Academy (disambiguation)
