= Klevis Dalipi =

Albanian footballer and coach (born 1976)

Personal information
- Full name: Klevis Dalipi
- Date of birth: 13 March 1976 (age 50)
- Place of birth: Elbasan, PSR Albania
- Position: Striker

Senior career*
Years	Team	Apps	(Gls)
1992–1997	Elbasani	101	(9)
1997–2000	Santa Clara	1	(0)
2000–2001	Feirense		
2001–2002	Ovarense	17	(2)
2002–2003	Bragança		
2003–2006	Elbasani	81	(15)
2006–2007	Vllaznia	28	(9)
2007–2008	Shkumbini	27	(9)
2008–2009	Bylis	29	(5)
2009–2012	Kamza	35	(20)

International career
2002	Albania	2	(0)

Managerial career
- 2016–2018: Partizani Tirana (assistant)
- 2016: Partizani Tirana (caretaker)
- 2018: Partizani Tirana
- 2019: Luftëtari
- 2020–2021: Korabi
- 2021: Tomori
- 2022: Apolonia
- 2023: Lushnja
- 2024–2026: Dyrrah City Football Academy
- 2026–: Burreli
- * Club domestic league appearances and goals

Klevis Dalipi (born 13 March 1976) is a retired Albanian football striker and football coach.

He previously played in Albania for Elbasani, Vllaznia and Shkumbini. He also played for Santa Clara and Ovarense in the Portuguese Second Division.
