= Goals Soccer Centers =

American 5-a-side soccer business

- Trade name: Goals Soccer Centers
- Industry: 5-a-side soccer
- Founded: July 25, 2017; 9 years ago
- Founder: Keith Rogers
- Headquarters: California
- Area served: United States
- Owner: City Football Group
- Website: www.goals-soccer.com

Goals Soccer Centers is an operator of dedicated five-a-side soccer centers based in California, with around 50 locations.

== History ==
Goals Soccer Centers originated from its British namesake when Keith Rogers, founder of Goals, opened the world's first 5-a-side soccer center in Glasgow, Scotland under the brand name of Pitz in 1987. After subsequent expansion across the United Kingdom, Rogers stepped down in January 2016 and relocated to the United States to become President of Goals USA. He opened his first two U.S.-based sites in South Gate and Pomona in the mid 2010s and thereafter signed contracts for sites in Rancho-Cucamonga and Covina. Rogers subsequently left Goals in January 2017 to launch the U.S.-based Goals Soccer Centers.

On July 25, 2017, City Football Group – owners of Major League Soccer club New York City FC and Premier League side Manchester City – signed a joint venture partnership with Goals to invest capital into the U.S. operations of the company to expand across the continent. Although Goals doubled its total locations by December 2018, further expansion plans were halted in 2019 after the company ran into financial troubles. Three months later, Goal's stake in the U.S. joint venture was sold to partners City Football Group, giving the soccer organization full control of the company.

== Manchester City Soccer Academy ==
As a result of its links to Manchester City, Goals sites operate Manchester City-branded soccer schools, where children can register to receive coaching from City coaches and learn to play with City tactics.
