= City Football Academy (New York) =

Training ground of New York City FC

City Football Academy, New York
- Interactive map of City Football Academy, New York
- Location: Orangeburg, Rockland County, New York
- Coordinates: 41°02′39″N 73°58′56″W
- Owner: New York City FC (City Football Group)
- Type: Training ground
- Acreage: 17 acres

Construction
- Built: 2016
- Opened: 2018
- Architect: Rafael Viñoly

Tenants
- New York City FC (Training)

The City Football Academy, New York, currently known as the Etihad City Football Academy for sponsorship reasons, is the training ground of professional football club New York City FC, located in Orangeburg on the outskirts of New York City. It is the third 'City Football Academy' to be built by City Football Group, the others being located in Manchester and Melbourne.

== Features ==
Built on land purchased in March 2016, with construction beginning in October of that year, the City Football Academy was designed to be both the training center and also the medical and infrastructal hub for the Major League Soccer club.

Situated on 17 acres of countryside real estate, its one and a half regulation-sized pitches have under-soil heating which allow them to be used all year round, while the grass of the pitches have been designed to create "the ideal playing surface" to suit the team's style of play. The whole facility has been designed to be among the top tier of amenities of its type in US soccer, and follows City Football Group's overarching ethos including such ideas as a circular locker room designed to encourage players to view each other as equals and to discourage cliques from forming.

The City Football Academy is located directly across the road from the facilities of World Class FC, a youth soccer club affiliated to New York City FC, where the NYCFC Girls Academy is based.

== See also ==
- City Football Group
- City Football Academy (disambiguation)
- Marinos Town
