= Simon Chadwick =

English footballer (born 1968)

Personal information
- Full name: Simon Leslie Chadwick
- Date of birth: 15 March 1968 (age 58)
- Place of birth: Liverpool, England
- Position: Forward

Youth career
- Wrexham

Senior career*
Years	Team	Apps	(Gls)
1985–1986	Wrexham	2	(0)
- * Club domestic league appearances and goals

Simon Leslie Chadwick (born 15 March 1968) is an English former professional footballer who played as a striker. He made two appearances in the English Football League as a teenager in the 1980s with Wrexham.
