= Goals Soccer Centres =

- Trade name: Goals
- Company type: Private
- Founded: 2000; 26 years ago
- Founder: Keith Roger
- Headquarters: Glasgow, Scotland, UK
- Area served: United Kingdom; United States
- Products: 5-a-side football
- Owner: NorthWind 5s Limited
- Parent: SoccerWorld
- Website: www.goalsfootball.co.uk

Goals Soccer Centres (trading as Goals) is an operator of dedicated 5-a-side football centres based in Glasgow, with 45 locations in the UK and four in Los Angeles.

== History ==
The origins of the industry go back to 1987 when Keith Rogers, co-founder of Goals, opened the world's first 5-a-side football centre in Paisley under the brand name of Pitz. The business grew and was sold to venture capitalists for £38 million in 1999, which then rebranded the business Powerleague. Keith Rogers thereafter led a management buy-in of an existing small local five-a-side football business in Glasgow the following year to create Goals Soccer Centres based in East Kilbride. He subsequently grew the business to 46 centres in the UK and launched the business in the US opening four centres in Southgate and Pomona, Rancho Cucamonga and Covina.

In 2012 shareholders rejected a bid by Ontario Teachers' Pension Plan and Keith Rogers to take the company private. Rogers left Goals at the end of 2016.

In October 2019, following financial problems it was announced that Goals Soccer Centres was being acquired by an Inflexion Private Equity and competitor Soccerworld through a company vehicle, Northwind 5s Limited.
