= Geography of Melbourne =

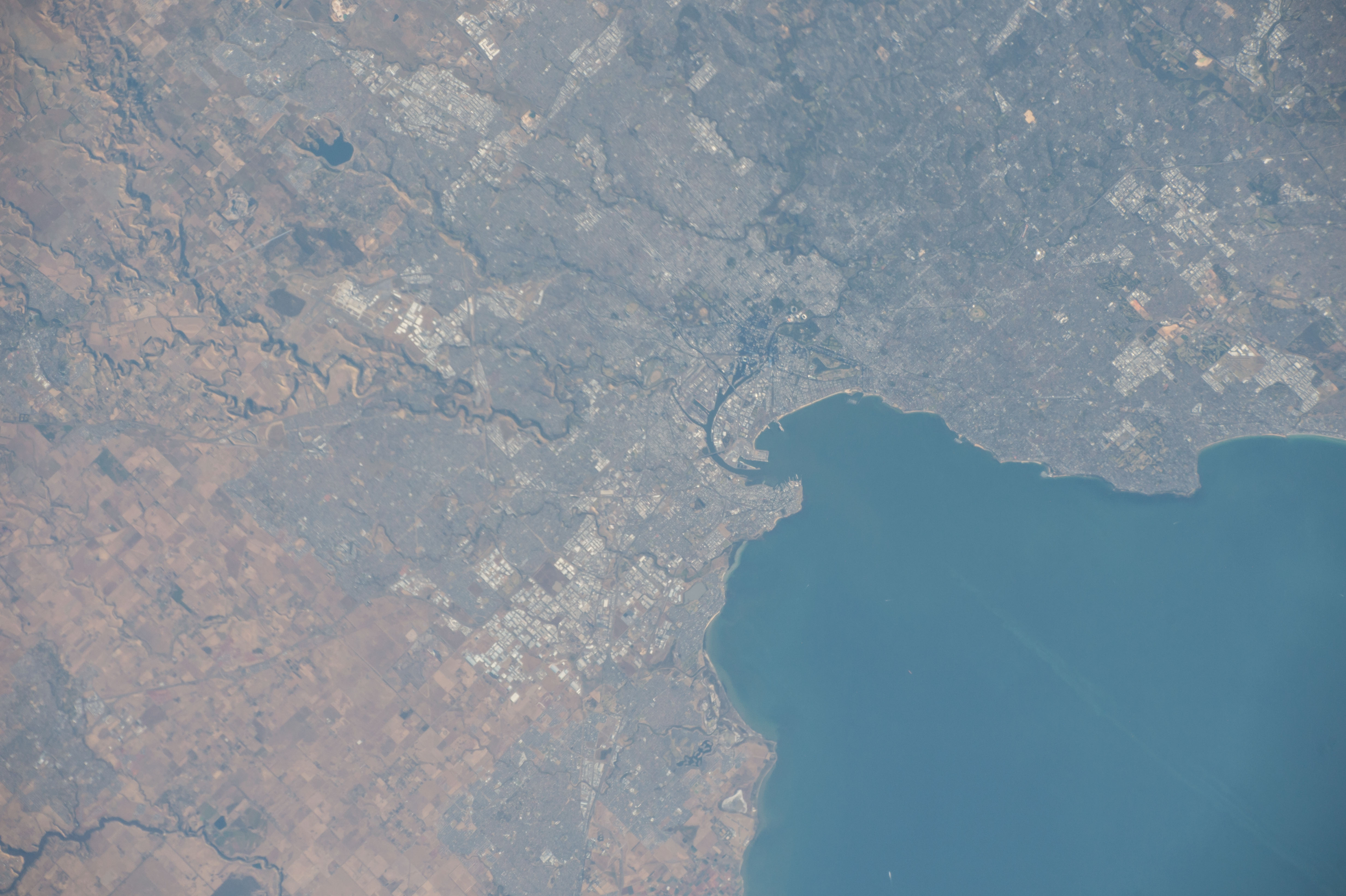
Satellite view of the Greater Melbourne area, showing Port Phillip Bay opening to the Bass Strait and surrounding plains of the city limits.

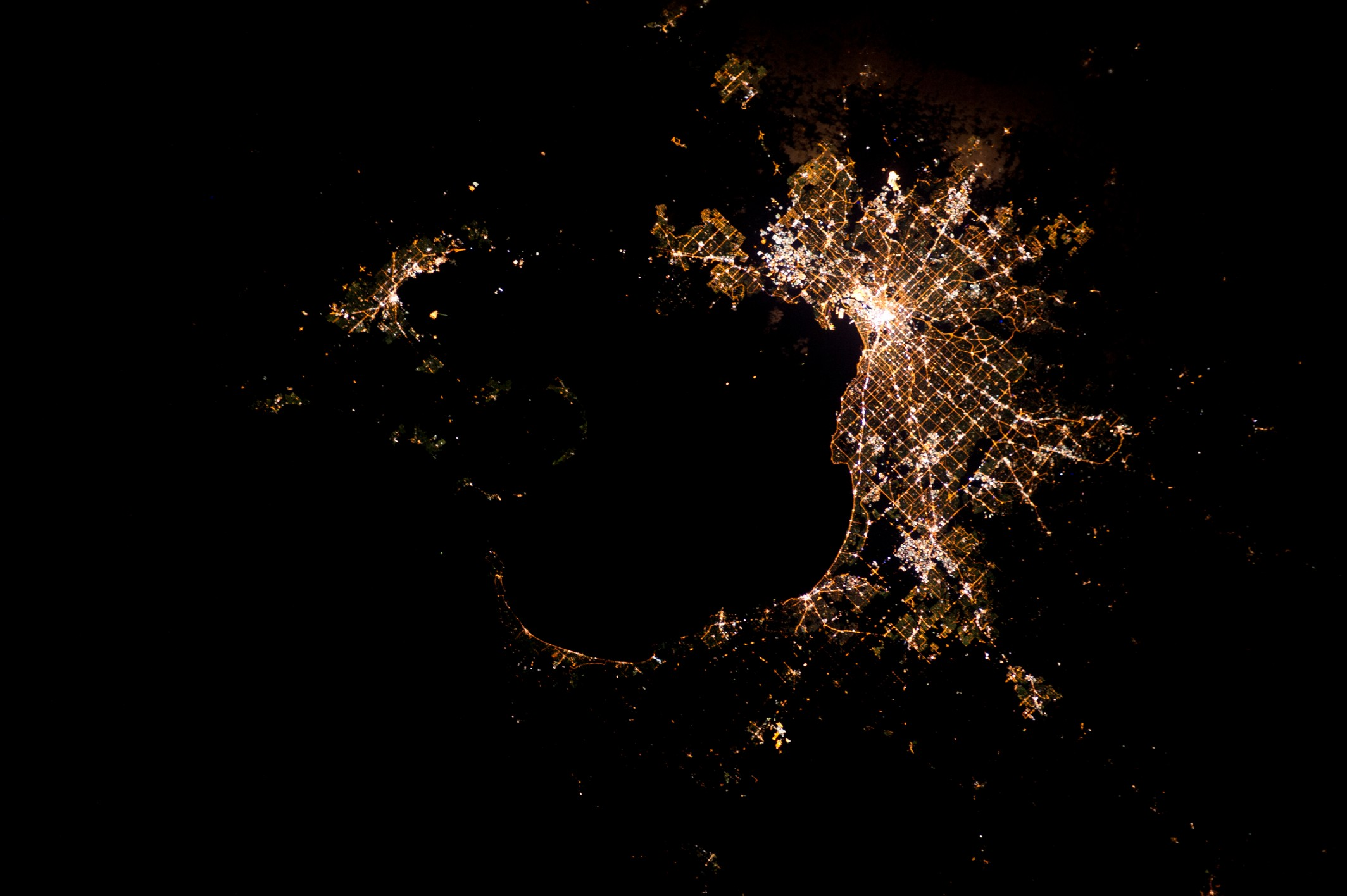
Greater Melbourne at night from the International Space Station

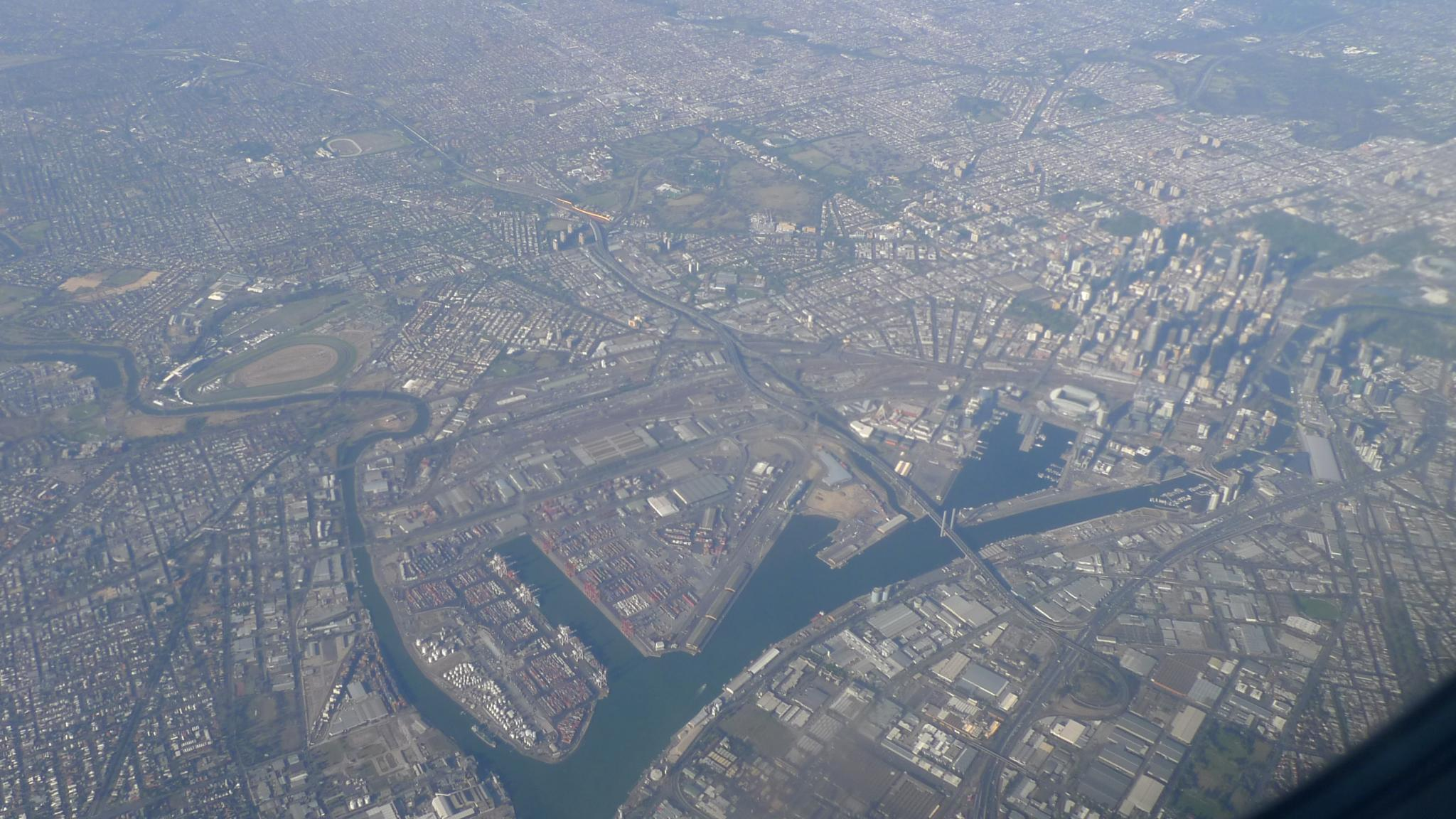
Aerial view of the city and inner-city surrounds, with the Yarra River traversing through the city centre (the cluster of buildings on the far right)

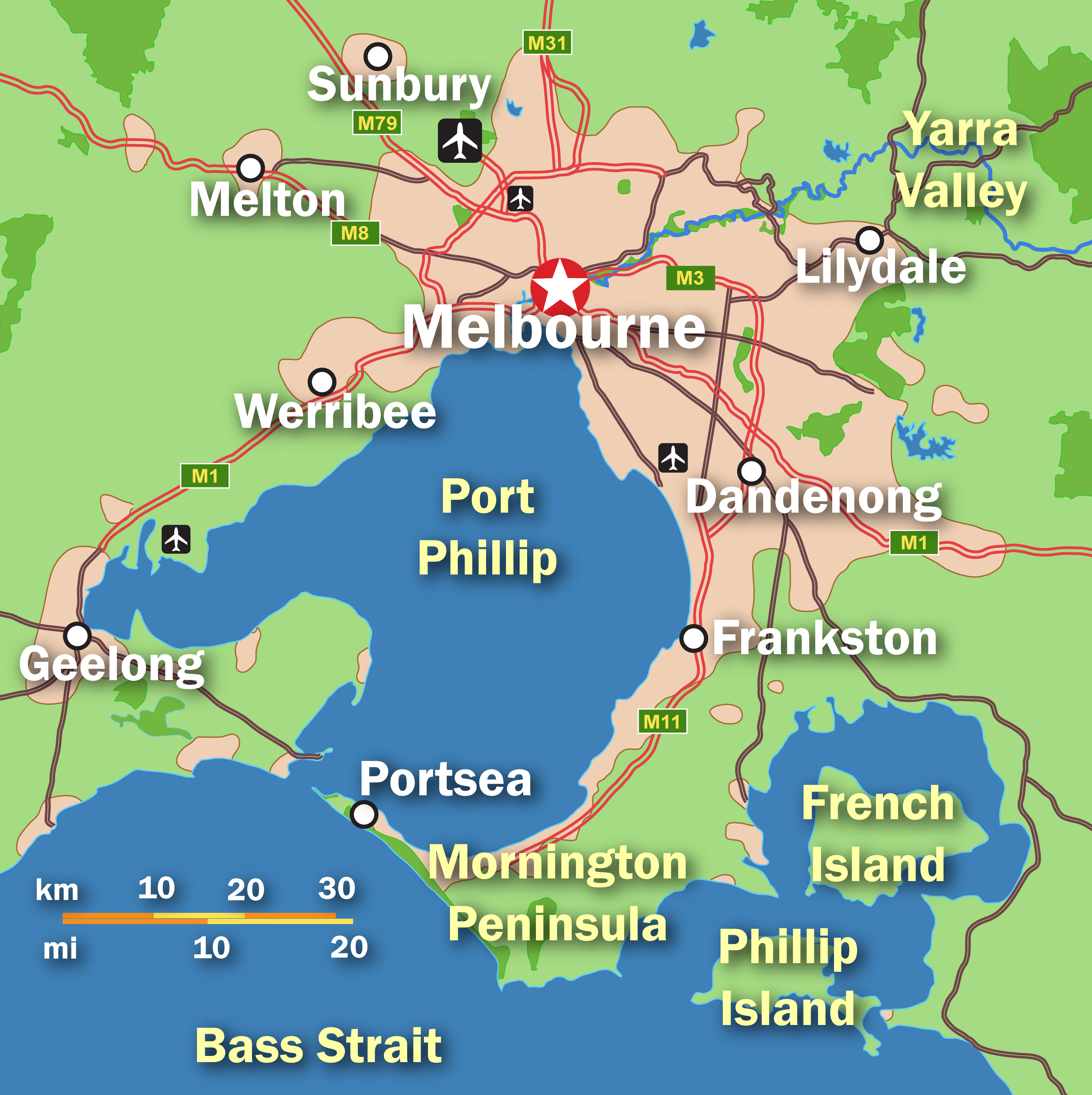
Map of the urban areas of Melbourne and Geelong and surrounding towns

Melbourne, the capital city of Victoria, Australia, is situated on the southeastern fringe of the Australian landmass and in the southern central part of the state. Melbourne covers an urbanised area (generally excluding nearby rural areas) of approximately 2,453 km^{2}–larger than that of Sydney, Greater London and Mexico City, with population density roughly around 16 people per hectare on average.

The city and metropolitan areas of Melbourne extend along the lower stretches of the Yarra River. Towards eastern Melbourne is the low-lying mountain ranges known as Dandenong Ranges, 35 km east of the city.

== Geology ==
Geologically, it is built on the conclusion of Quaternary lava flows to the west, Silurian mudstones to the east, and Holocene sand accumulation to the southeast along Port Phillip. The southeastern suburbs are situated on the Selwyn fault which transects Mount Martha and Cranbourne.

== Topography ==
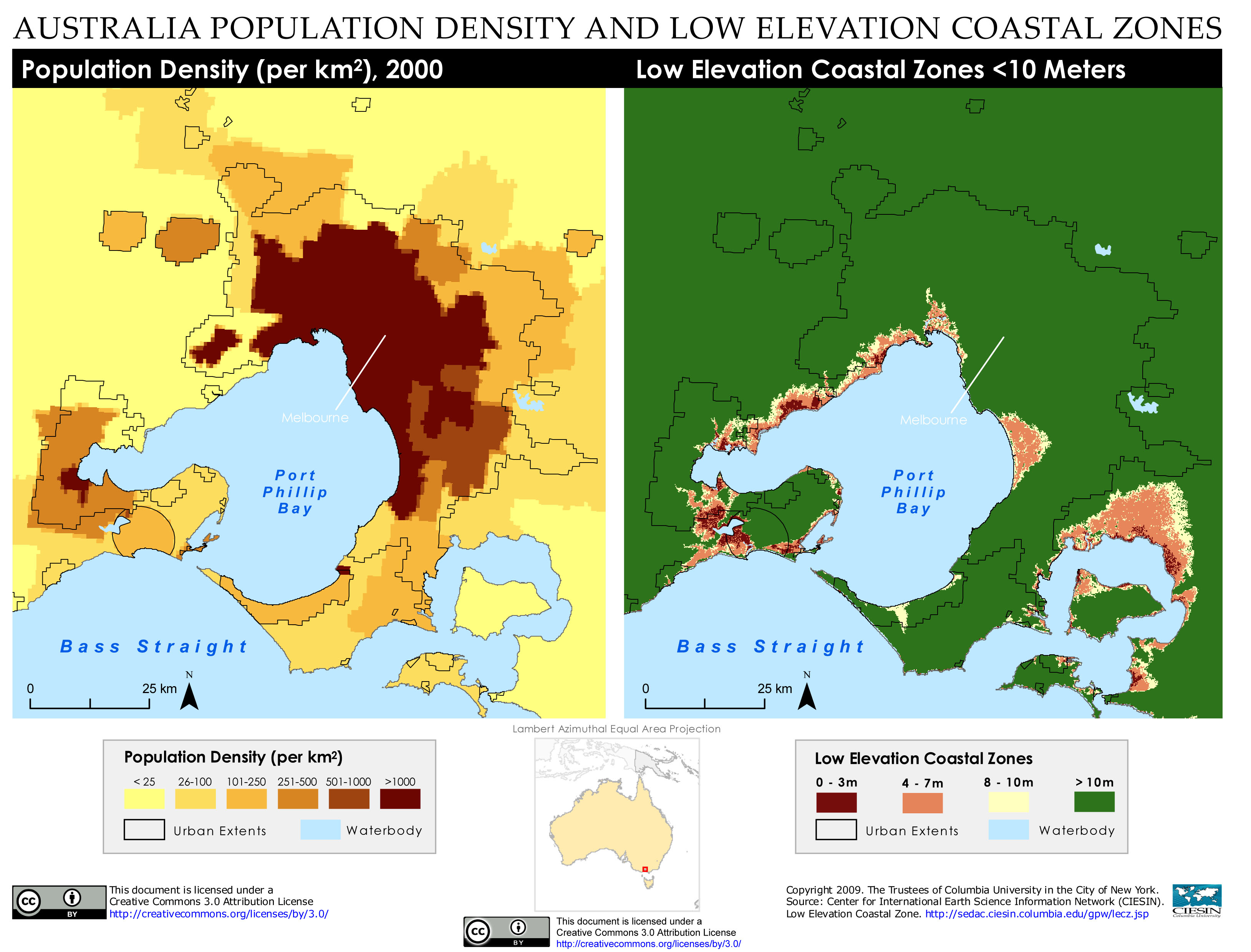
Population density and low elevation coastal zones in Melbourne. Melbourne is especially vulnerable to sea level rise.

Melbourne extends along the Yarra River towards the Yarra Valley and the Dandenong Ranges to the east. It extends northward through the undulating bushland valleys of the Yarra's tributaries—Moonee Ponds Creek (toward Tullamarine Airport), Merri Creek, Darebin Creek and Plenty River—to the outer suburban growth corridors of Craigieburn and Whittlesea. The western part of the metropolitan area lies within the Victorian Volcanic Plain Grasslands biome. The southeastern suburbs (from Frankston) are situated within the Gippsland Plains Grassy Woodland zone.

The city reaches south-east through Dandenong to the growth corridor of Pakenham towards West Gippsland, and southward through the Dandenong Creek valley, the Mornington Peninsula and the city of Frankston taking in the peaks of Olivers Hill, Mount Martha and Arthurs Seat, extending along the shores of Port Phillip as a single conurbation to reach the exclusive suburb of Portsea and Point Nepean.

In the west, it extends along the Maribyrnong River and its tributaries north towards Sunbury and the foothills of the Macedon Ranges, and along the flat volcanic plain country towards Melton in the west, Werribee at the foothills of the You Yangs granite ridge and Geelong as part of the greater metropolitan area to the south-west.

=== Coast ===
Melbourne's major bayside beaches are located in the south-eastern suburbs along the shores of Port Phillip Bay, in areas like Port Melbourne, Albert Park, St Kilda, Elwood, Brighton, Sandringham, Mentone and Frankston although there are beaches in the western suburbs of Altona and Williamstown. The nearest surf beaches are located 85 kilometres (53 mi) south-west of the Melbourne CBD in the back-beaches of Rye, Sorrento and Portsea.

== See also ==
- Geology of Victoria

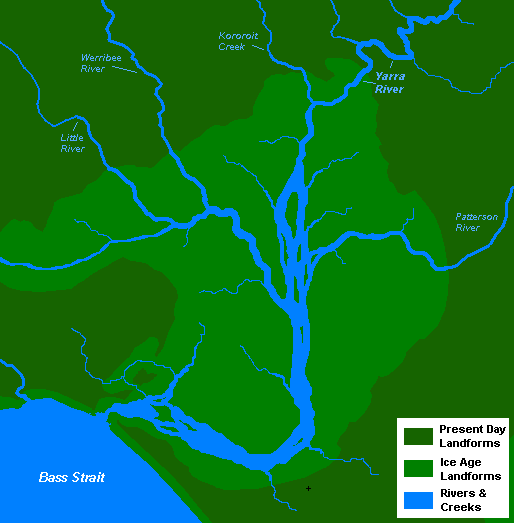
A very basic map of the Port Phillip Plains approximately 10-12 thousand years ago, prior to sea level rise that filled the area of land now known as Port Phillip, and the course of the Yarra River as it emptied into Bass Strait. More exact details regarding the course of the Yarra River in the Port Phillip Plains are needed.
