= City Football Group =

British-based holding company

City Football Group Limited
- Type: Private
- Industry: Sports; Sports services
- Founded: 2013; 13 years ago
- Founder: Mansour bin Zayed Al Nahyan; Khaldoon Al Mubarak
- Headquarters: Manchester
- Key people: Khaldoon Al Mubarak; Li Ruigang; Brian Marwood; Ferran Soriano; Tom Glick; Egon Durban
- Revenue: ▼£544.426 million (2020)
- Operating income: ▼ -£165.861 million (2020)
- Net income: ▼ -£205.179 million (2020)
- Total assets: ▲£1.53 billion (2020)
- Owner: Abu Dhabi United Group (81%); Silver Lake (18%); CITIC Group (1%)
- Number of employees: 1,229 (2020)
- Subsidiaries: Manchester City (100%); Melbourne City (100%); New York City (80%); Torque (100%); Troyes (100%); Lommel (99%); Girona (47%); Shenzhen Peng City (47%); Palermo (94.94%); Bahia (90%); City Football Academy; City Football Marketing; City Football Services; City Football Japan; City Football Singapore; City Football China; City Football India; Co-op Live Arena; CFG Stadium Group; Goals Soccer Centers
- Website: www.cityfootballgroup.com

City Football Group Limited (CFG) is a British-based holding company that administers association football clubs. The group is owned by three organisations, of which 81% is majority-owned by Abu Dhabi United Group, 18% by the American firm Silver Lake, and 1% by Chinese firms China Media Capital and CITIC Capital. The Abu Dhabi United Group is owned by Sheikh Mansour bin Zayed Al Nahyan, member of the Abu Dhabi royal family and vice president of the United Arab Emirates. It is the largest multi-club ownership group in the world, by number of clubs.

The group derives its name from Manchester City, its flagship football club, and acts as the club's parent company. CFG also owns stakes in clubs in the United States, Australia, Spain, Brazil, Uruguay, China, Belgium, France, Italy and Turkey.

== History ==
Founded in 2013, City Football Group is the realisation of a business vision by former Barcelona Economy Vice President Ferran Soriano. Soriano first conceived of the ideal of a global football entity while at the Catalan club, beginning with the creation of Barca-branded overseas academies. Soriano contacted Major League Soccer Commissioner Don Garber about creating a Barcelona-branded MLS franchise, and the pair progressed as far as looking into several locations to place the team, but ultimately these plans were curtailed when Soriano and seven other members of Barcelona's board chose to resign in protest of then-President Joan Laporta's leadership.

After a four-year break from football management, Soriano was hired in late 2012 to replace Garry Cook as CEO of Manchester City following the latter's resignation. Soriano revived his ambitions of creating a global football business entity, beginning by resuming dialogues with Garber. Their discussions resulted in the announcement of New York City as MLS' 20th expansion side less than one year later in May 2013. In the process of managing the creation of a second football team City Football Group was created, designed to be the holding company to which both Manchester City and NYCFC belonged. CFG expanded at the start of 2014 when it partnered with Rugby league side Melbourne Storm to acquire a controlling stake in A-League franchise Melbourne Heart for 12 million Australian dollars. The club would subsequently be rebranded to Melbourne City, and their badge changed to a design similar to New York City's badge as part of CFG's early attempts to synergise their investments as a brand, and the club's colours would slowly be changed to sky blue with their red-and-white stripes retained as away colours.

In the weeks following their purchase of Melbourne City, CFG indicated their intentions of investing in women's football by rebranding Manchester City's female affiliate as Manchester City Women's Football Club, and successfully lobbied for the team to be added to the top tier of the FA Women's Super League, promising to invest in women's football on a scale never before seen in England. Later the following year, CFG would grow again with the purchase of a 20% in Japanese side Yokohama F Marinos, the traditional company team of group sponsor Nissan.

In April 2017, after a near three-year pause in its expansion, City Football Group announced the Uruguayan second-tier side Torque, who would later be renamed Montevideo City Torque. Several months later, Torque would be followed in by Spanish second division club Girona, a club with ownership links to incumbent Manchester City manager Pep Guardiola.

2019 saw the beginning of an increase in CFG's activity. The purchase of Chinese third division club Shenzhen Peng City (known as Sichuan Jiuniu at that time) was followed towards the end of the year by a second venture in Asia, when the group bought a controlling stake in Indian Super League franchise Mumbai City. 2020 similarly would see two club purchases in European football, first of Lommel of Belgium and then of Troyes of France, with both acquisitions occurring amid financial challenges faced by clubs across European football during the COVID-19 pandemic. In the same year they would also expand their business interests by taking sole control of US-based five-a-side football business Goals Soccer Centers, a business they had previously invested in, following the near-collapse of the company's owners due to an internal scandal.

In March 2022, Dutch second-tier side NAC Breda announced that following an investigation into the best bidders to sell the club's shares, the shareholders of the club had agreed to a sale to CFG. In response, the club's fans held protests both in Breda, and also Manchester and Lommel. A month later, a group of shareholders with key voting rights announced that, in light of the backlash, they had elected instead to sell their shares to a local consortium.

In December 2025, due to uncertainty in Indian football, CFG divested their shares in Mumbai City, marking the end of their six-year stint as majority owners. In June 2026 Nissan purchased all CFG owned shares in Yokohama F. Marinos.

== Principles and interests ==
Since its inception, commenters have drawn parallels between City Football Group and Ferran Soriano's ideas spelled out in his 2011 book Goal: The Ball Doesn't Go In By Chance, in which Soriano remarked that the natural evolution of club brands was to expand globally, and that doing so could include the creation of franchise clubs in foreign leagues. His book continued to expound upon the notion that appealing to foreign fans who had no strongly-ingrained non-domestic allegiances was an important facet of business growth of sporting brands, and that giving those fans a domestic side to support alongside and affiliated to their European club could encourage more loyalty from them. This idea would be termed "Disneyfication" by Professor Simon Chadwick, an expert in Eurasian sport at Emlyon Business School and himself a confidant of Soriano.

=== Branding and player development ===
Early growth in the group focused on teams sharing a common identity and an associated brand, which aligned with the traditional identity of Manchester City and was viewed as a key way of helping the Manchester club build up its foreign support. This also matched Soriano's well-reported interest in placing City Football Group as a lynchpin in the opening-up of national markets in which association football has not previously been able to secure a strong presence, through the operation of and investment in franchises in those countries.

The first entity to join CFG was the newly created New York City, with the club announcing that they would sport the familiar sky blue kit with white shorts which Manchester City have traditionally been associated with, and the rebranded Melbourne City (originally named Melbourne Heart) similarly switched to sky blue after defeating challenges from fellow A-League club Sydney. With the purchase of Mumbai City and the renaming of Club Atletico Torque to Montevideo City Torque, five teams in the group feature the word "City" in their name, and similarly all five wear sky blue kits. NYCFC's circular badge design would also be mimicked by the majority of the clubs in CFG: Melbourne City, Manchester City, Mumbai City, Torque, Girona, Lommel, and Shenzhen Peng City all went on to adopt badges with the same basic style. Following from these changes, it was reported that the company's aim was to own a team on each continent with the "City" brand in its name. They have aggressively defended the City brand, issuing a cease and desist letter against the Chilean side Santiago City for using a club crest similar to Manchester City's.

Developments within Manchester City's academy would ultimately lead to a shift in strategy and focus of the group. Efforts to continue their success in bringing through youth talent led to the buying of promising players in the early teenage years, many of whom would go on to be sold for a large profit. This prompted Soriano and CFG's executive management to change their ambitions to put more emphasis on purchasing smaller clubs in strong existing football markets, with the intention of turning them into specialists centres for acquiring and training future stars from their local areas.

=== Collaboration between clubs ===
One of the core philosophies of City Football Group since its inception has been the mutual supporting of clubs through combined scouting and player sharing. While virtually all large European clubs operate an international scouting network, financial demands make it impossible to access local knowledge in foreign countries to the same extent as a domestic club could. CFG clubs therefore provide invaluable services to each other by using their own local scouting networks to share information on players between clubs. With their combined knowledge, the group claims to have extensive information on half a million players around the world. Possessing such a network then allows the local clubs to sign players early in their development, safe in the knowledge that the range of clubs CFG owns means that they can be placed at any of a number of sides as their development continues and the need for other challenges arises. The player-sharing element of the City network was first evident with the high-profile transfer of Aaron Mooy from Melbourne City to Manchester City – an early case of utilising the network to support revenue generation – with the 2020–21 season seeing Manchester City send 14 foreign-sourced youth players out on loan, predominantly to other group clubs.

In addition to internal player movements, CFG has also sought to foster movements of coaching staff within their network; among the most notable relocations are French manager Eric Mombaerts, who has worked with Yokohama F. Marinos, Melbourne City and Troyes, Manchester City Women manager Nick Cushing transferring to New York and English coach Liam Manning transferring from the NYCFC academy to take over management of Lommel's first team.

The second of CFG's core philosophies regarding club collaboration is on- and off-pitch technical information sharing. Based around the tactics of Manchester City manager Pep Guardiola – long coveted for the Manchester job by Ferran Soriano and Txiki Begiristain after their experience working with him in Barcelona – all of City Football Group's clubs are given access to extensive databases of Manchester City's tactics and coaching methods, enabling them all to follow the group directive to use the same style of football, a style occasionally referred to as "the City Way". This synergy of tactical style extends beyond their first teams to the academies and women's sections. In addition to this, the clubs also share other information, such as medical, performance monitoring and player management.

=== Investment in women's football ===
Four of City Football Group's ten clubs sport women's teams, with Torque expected to launch a women's team in 2021 and New York City having previously held discussions about an affiliation with Sky Blue in 2014. In both Manchester and Melbourne, CFG (re)launched new women's sides in 2014 and 2015, promising to invest in women's football in unprecedent ways. In both cities, the women's teams would ultimately be given bespoke facilities which, in contrast to the standard for football clubs, shared training locations with their affiliated men's teams. Similarly, both cities would see returns for their investment, with Manchester City Women repeatedly finishing amongst the top two and winning a series of domestic trophies while Melbourne City's unprecedented investment in Australian women's football – an area which had previously been underfunded and largely forgotten in the country – earned the side plaudits for their forward-thinking and would see their female side crowned Grand Final winners four times in five seasons.

=== Esports ===
Looking to capitalise on the growth of esports, and for City Football Group to be seen as always being at the forefront of innovation, CFG made their first venture into digital gaming in June 2016 when they signed Kieran "Kez" Brown to represent Manchester City at FIFA tournaments and fan events, as well as to make digital content for their media profiles.

Over the following years, CFG expanded their esports footprint as most of their clubs signed players to represent them in FIFA tournaments, with most clubs keeping one PlayStation player and one Xbox player on their books to represent them at all times. By early 2021, CFG would have a total of 16 professional esports players across their various clubs. In 2021, Manchester City became the first CFG club to expand beyond FIFA when they signed Aiden "Threats" Mong to represent them in Fortnite tournaments. Unlike the other CFG teams, Manchester City would also go on to create separate esports teams in China and South Korea to compete in Asia-localised tournaments.

In addition to having their own esports players, CFG have also collaborated with existing teams. In 2019, Manchester City announced a partnership with FaZe Clan which would see the two run various esports competitions and merchandising lines, as well as allowing City's and FaZe's FIFA players to share facilities and train together. In 2022, CFG announced that it was sponsoring Blue United, in a move which would see Blue United wear CFG-style sky blue shirts at competitive events.

== CFG-owned clubs ==
City Football Group owns or holds stakes in clubs across multiple football confederations:

| Club | City | Country | Ownership stake | Year acquired | League | Confederation | Notes |
|---|---|---|---|---|---|---|---|
| Manchester City | Manchester | England | 100% | 2008 | Premier League | UEFA | Flagship club |
| New York City | New York City | United States | 80% | 2013 | Major League Soccer | CONCACAF | Expansion club |
| Melbourne City | Melbourne | Australia | 100% | 2014 | A-League Men | AFC | Formerly Melbourne Heart |
| Torque | Montevideo | Uruguay | 100% | 2017 | Liga AUF Uruguaya | CONMEBOL | Formerly Club Atlético Torque |
| Girona | Girona | Spain | 47% | 2017 | Segunda División | UEFA | Joint ownership |
| Shenzhen Peng City | Shenzhen | China | 47% | 2019 | Chinese Super League | AFC | |
| Lommel | Lommel | Belgium | 99% | 2020 | Belgian Pro League | UEFA | |
| Troyes | Troyes | France | 100% | 2020 | Ligue 1 | UEFA | |
| Palermo | Palermo | Italy | 94.94% | 2022 | Serie B | UEFA | |
| Bahia | Salvador | Brazil | 90% | 2023 | Campeonato Brasileiro Série A | CONMEBOL | |

=== Former clubs ===
| Club | City | Country | Ownership period | League | Confederation | Notes |
|---|---|---|---|---|---|---|
| Mumbai City | Mumbai | India | 2019–2025 | Indian Super League | AFC | Divested |
| Yokohama F. Marinos | Yokohama | Japan | 2014–2026 | J1 League | AFC | Continued as partner club |

== CFG partner clubs ==
City Football Group also maintains partnerships with several clubs:

| Club | City | Country | Partnered since | League | Confederation | Notes |
|---|---|---|---|---|---|---|
| Club Bolívar | La Paz | Bolivia | 2021 | FBF División Profesional | CONMEBOL | First partner club |
| Vannes | Vannes | France | 2021 | Championnat National 3 | UEFA | |
| Geylang International | Singapore | Singapore | 2023 | Singapore Premier League | AFC | |
| İstanbul Başakşehir | Istanbul | Turkey | 2024 | Süper Lig | UEFA | |
| Al Jazira | Abu Dhabi | United Arab Emirates | 2025 | UAE Pro League | AFC | Owned by CFG owner Mansour bin Zayed Al Nahyan |
| Yokohama F. Marinos | Yokohama | Japan | 2026 | J1 League | AFC | Formerly 20% owned by CFG |

=== Club Bolivar ===
It was announced on 12 January 2021 that Club Bolivar had become the first partner club for the group. Club Bolivar is the most successful Bolivian club, having won 30 domestic titles since it was founded in La Paz on 12 April 1925. The owner of Club Bolivar, Marcelo Claure, would go on to join the ownership group of New York City in September 2024, taking a 10% interest in the MLS club.

Honours after partnership :

- División de Fútbol Profesional (2): 2022-A, 2024
- Copa de la División Profesional (1): 2023

=== Vannes ===
It was announced on 17 February 2021 that French fourth tier side Vannes had become the latest partner club for the group. The two clubs were already linked after Vannes' President Maxime Ray had joined CFG to become a minority shareholder in Troyes as part of the 2020 purchase, though he agreed to have no operational role at Troyes as part of the takeover.

=== Geylang International ===
It was announced on 1 February 2023 that Singapore Premier League club Geylang International had become the first Southeast Asian partner club for the group. The agreement is set to be an initial, highly targeted collaboration between both entities with the potential to evolve into a broader, more comprehensive strategic partnership in the future.

=== İstanbul Başakşehir ===
It was revealed on 18 February 2024 that Turkish Süper Lig club İstanbul Başakşehir signed an agreement with the group in order to improve their football strategy, recruitment, scouting and coaching methodology.

=== Al Jazira ===
On September 9 2025 it was announced that the group would be collaborating with UAE Pro League club Al Jazira, an expansion upon existing consultation work with Al Jazira Academy. Mansour bin Zayed Al Nahyan, the majority owner of City Football Group, is the chairman of Al Jazira dating back to before his initial takeover of Manchester City.

=== Yokohama F. Marinos ===
On June 25 2026, as part of the announcement that Nissan had taken ownership of all CFG shares in Yokohama F. Marinos, it was announced that the relationship would continue as partner clubs.

== Businesses ==
=== Goals Soccer Centres ===
On 25 July 2017, City Football Group signed a joint venture partnership with Goals Soccer Centres, a 5-a-side football pitch operator, to invest capital into the US operations of the company in order to expand across North America. On 3 February 2020, CFG purchased the remaining 50% to take full ownership of the joint venture

== See also ==
- Manchester City ownership and finances
