= Marinos Town =

Soccer venue in Yokohama, Japan

Coordinates: 35°27′48.00″N 139°37′48.00″E

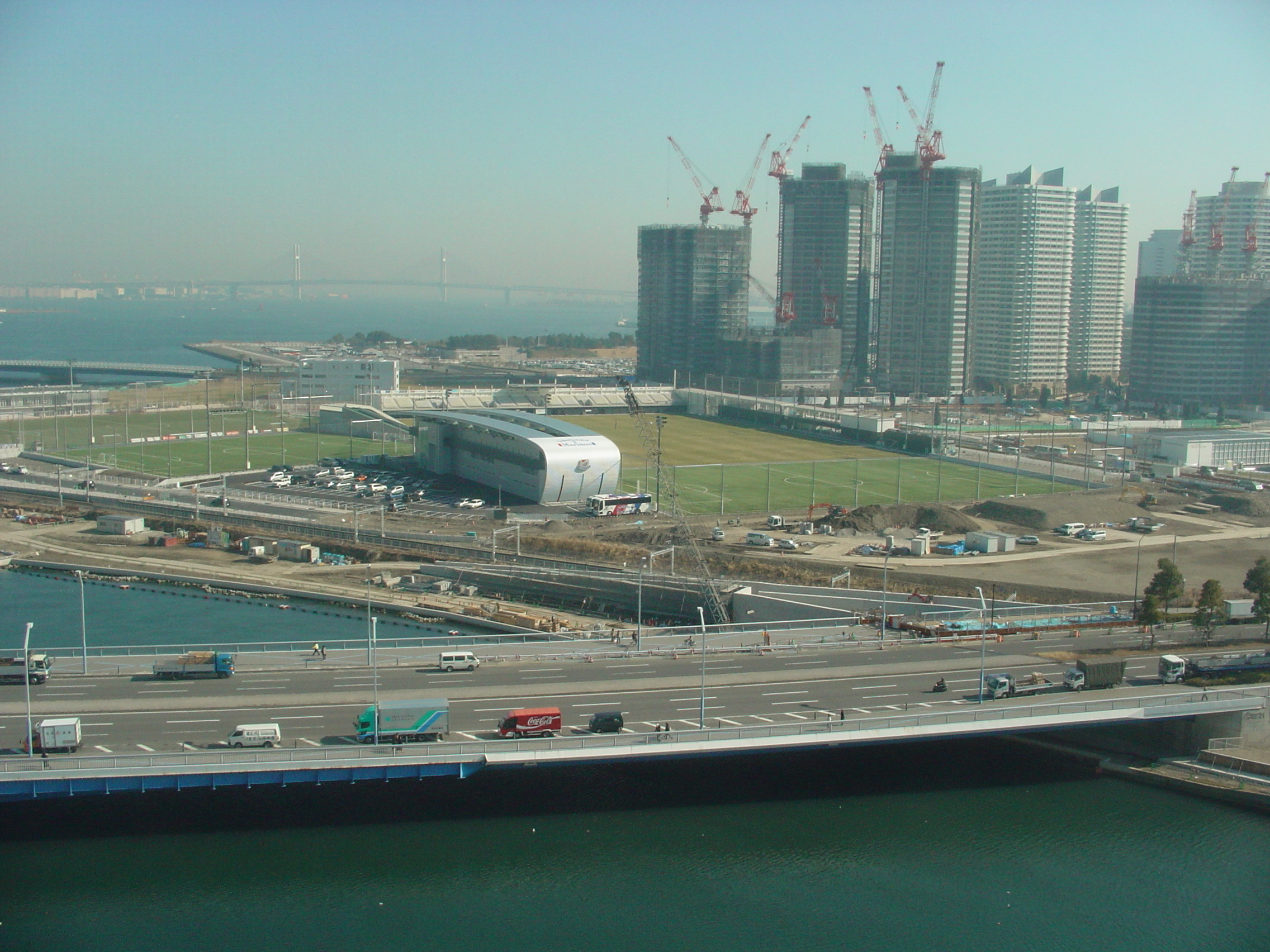
Complete view to Marinos Town

Marinos Town (マリノスタウン, Marinosu Taun) was a football (soccer) venue in Yokohama, Japan. The official name is "Yokohama F.Marinos MM21 Training Center". It was the head office and training facility of the Yokohama F.Marinos. It was located in the Minato Mirai 21 (Nishi-ku) area of Yokohama. The closest station to Marinos Town was Shin-Takashima Station on the Minato Mirai Line.

Before moving to Marinos Town, the Yokohama F.Marinos trained in Totsuka training center (Totsuka-ku) and had their front office at Shin-Koyasu (Kanagawa-ku). This was considered to be detrimental to the smooth running of the club.

The construction plan was announced on November 29, 2004. Work start of training pitches and shops on June 17, 2006, and other facilities on January 27, 2007. This new training facility has the clubhouse, front office and training pitches all in one location to aid communication between players and staff. In addition, it is more conveniently located near to Yokohama Station and Shin-Takashima Station for easy fan access. Marinos Town also contains a number of futsal pitches which are available for public hire.

However, some controversy has been caused by the building of Marinos Town. The large expense of the project has meant that the finances of the team have become stretched. Supporters of the club point to the release of players such as Tatsuhiko Kubo, Daisuke Oku and Dutra as proof of this. Indeed, there is a certain amount of displeasure directed towards chairman Shigeo Hidaritomo because of these problems.

== Facilities ==
- Area: about 45600m²
- Front office and clubhouse
- Four pitches (two natural turf, two artificial turf)
- Training slope
- Stands (2043seats)
- Yokohama F.Marinos official goods shop "TRICOLORE ONE"
- Italian restaurant "IVI"
- Convenience store "LAWSON"
- Parking
