= Etihad Campus =

Area of Sportcity, Manchester, England

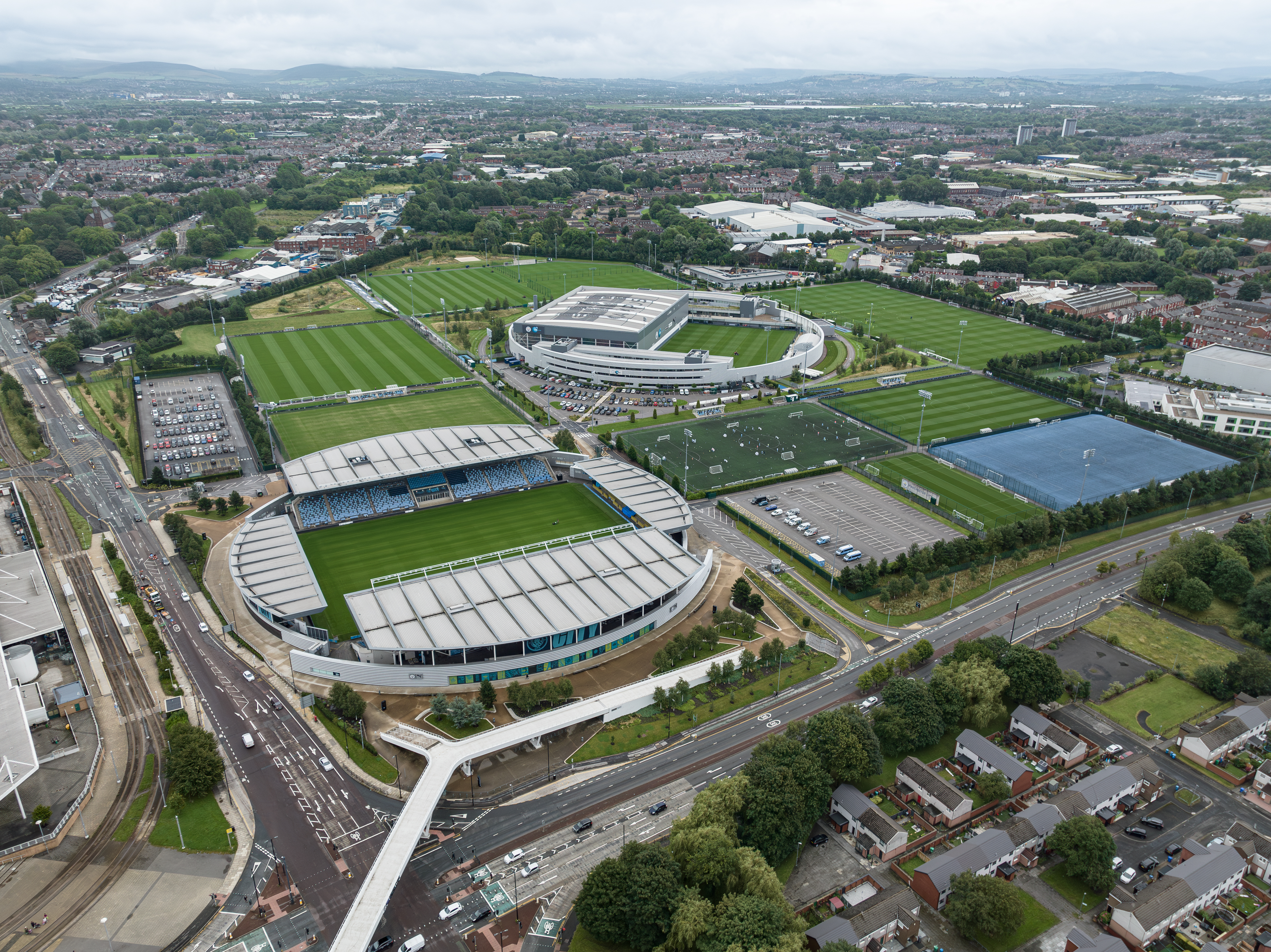
- Interactive map of Etihad Campus
- Location: Sportcity, Bradford-with-Beswick and Clayton, Greater Manchester
- Coordinates: 53°28′48″N 02°11′21″W
- Owner: Manchester City
- Type: Sports, community, leisure

Construction
- Built: 2012–present
- Opened: 2013: (Metrolink tram stops); 2013: (Etihad Campus); 2013: (Velopark); 2014: (City Football Academy); 2013/17: (Beswick Community Hub); 2013: (Connell Sixth Form College); 2014: (Beswick Leisure Centre); 2016: (Inst.of Health & Performance); 2017: (office and retail development); 2015/16: (Etihad Stadium expansion); 2015: (South Stand and pitch side); 2024: (23,500 capacity arena); 2026: (North Stand Expansion, Hotel and Fan Park)

Etihad Campus is an area of Sportcity, Manchester which is mostly owned and operated by Manchester City football club. The campus includes the Etihad Stadium, the City Football Academy (CFA) training facility and club world headquarters, and undeveloped land adjacent to both of these facilities. These two main portions of the campus site are linked by a 60-metre landmark pedestrian walkway/footbridge that spans the junction of Alan Turing Way and Ashton New Road. The term Etihad Campus embraces both the stadium – which already existed when the name was coined in 2010 – as well as much of the surrounding undeveloped land that existed at that time, although the term is also frequently used as a direct synonym for just the CFA portion.

The development of the southeastern portion of the Etihad Campus site is focused on the regeneration of the Clayton Aniline site which consists of 80 acres (320,000 m^{2}) of brownfield land. The initial phase of the campus development included the construction of the new Manchester City training facility which was completed and officially opened in December 2014. Adjacent to the CFA facility is the Connell Sixth Form College – named after Anna Connell, the founder of St Mark's Gorton which later became Manchester City Football Club – which forms part of the Beswick Community Hub. The construction of the college was jointly funded by Manchester City and Manchester City Council and it opened to receive its first students in August 2013.

The Beswick Community Hub is being developed on 16 acres (65,000 m^{2}) of the 80-acre site originally purchased by the football club in order to develop its CFA facility, but like the footbridge linking the CFA to the Etihad Stadium, the club has donated this portion of its land purchase back to the local community so that it can be jointly developed with Manchester City Council to form a southern gateway approach to the completed Etihad Campus. Also part of the jointly funded and developed Beswick Community Hub, across from it on the western side of Alan Turing Way, is the new Beswick Leisure Centre. The construction of the leisure centre is also complete and it opened to the public in October 2014.

Two further developments that were jointly funded were the Manchester Institute of Health and Performance (MIHP), which opened in 2016, and beyond the completion of the MIHP there are plans to develop commercial office space, shops and retail opportunities on the northwestern side of the hub.

The transformation of East Manchester is a key part of the regional core development strategy from 2012 to 2027, and likewise the scheme forms an integral part of Manchester City's aspiration to develop homegrown talent.

In 2020, a 23,500 capacity indoor arena by the Oak View Group was proposed adjacent to the stadium, and which would be the largest in western Europe if built. Work began on the Co-op Live in 2022 and was completed in May 2024. An expansion of the stadium's North Stand, including the construction of a hotel and covered fan zone is currently in progress and due to be completed in 2026.

== Background ==
East Manchester has historically been for industrial use. The site which the Etihad Stadium sits on was contaminated for the construction, and so a non-occupied use was required. Areas east of the city have undergone privately funded regeneration, such as the New Islington project by developers, Urban Splash and the NOMA scheme east of Manchester city centre – but the area has remnants of industrial usage and land is often brownfield. The site of the new training and community facility was previously home to Clayton Aniline Company, a company which produced dyestuffs. The firm disbanded in 2004 leaving the Clayton Aniline site derelict.

Since being taken over in 2008, the club have embarked on a large spending spree to reach the pinnacle of English football. In 2011, the club won the FA Cup – ending the club's 35-year trophy drought – and then won the Premier League in 2012. The investment has come at a cost, with the club spending a net-£330 million on infrastructure, debt and transfers. The club hope prize money (from the Champions League particularly), increased commercial revenue and ticket sales will turn the club into a profit-making entity which provides a return on investment. As early as 5 September 2008, just days after the takeover the new owners were reported to be exploring the possible expansion around the stadium.

In July 2011, it was announced the area where the developments was to be called the Etihad Campus. In return Etihad Airways paid sponsorship to Manchester City for ten years. In return to Manchester City Council, who own the stadium, Etihad created a British hub for Etihad Airways at Manchester Airport (majority owned by Manchester City Council), creating further jobs and helping to fuel the £600m Manchester Airport City development.

== Proposed development ==
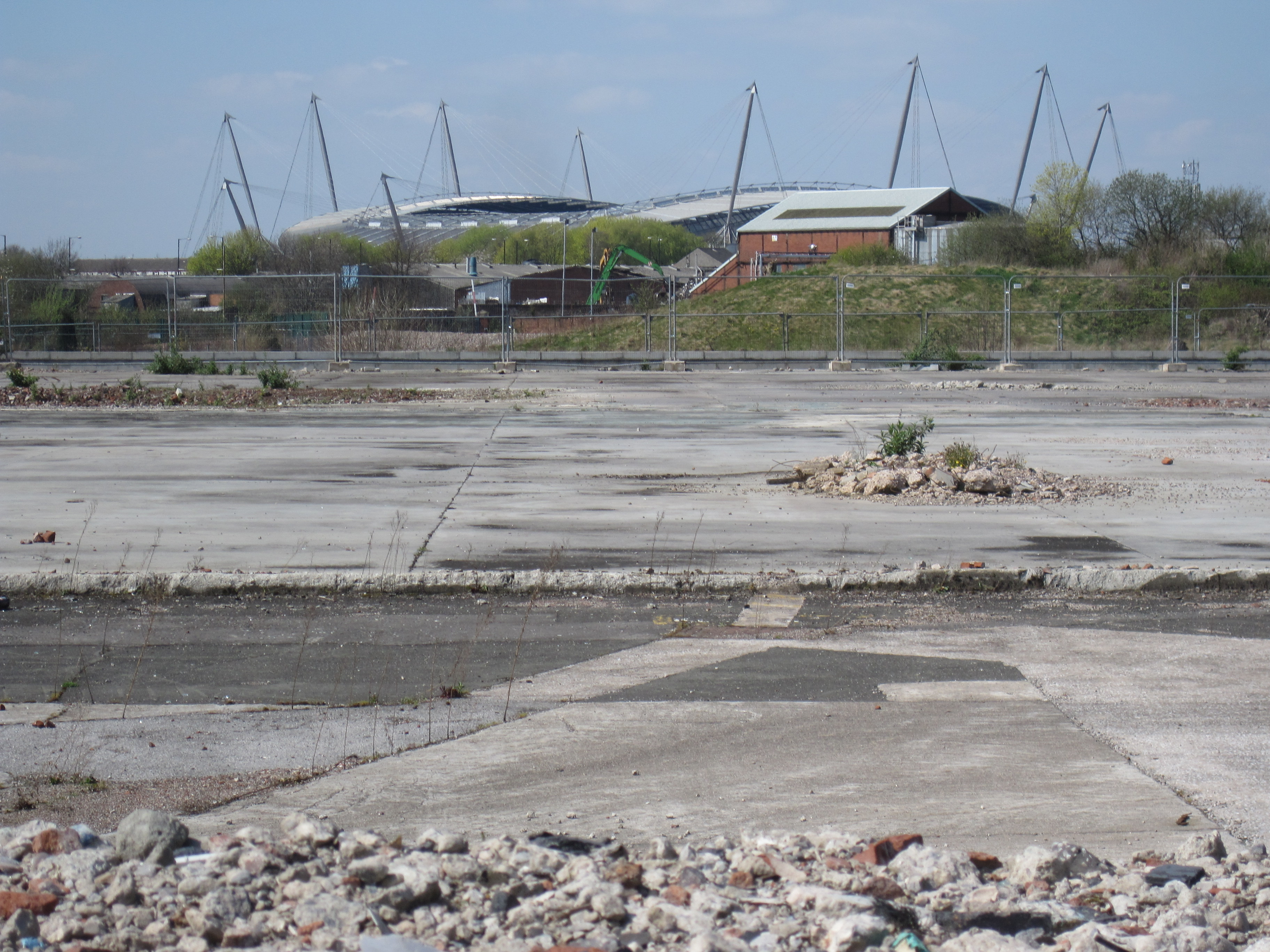
The derelict Clayton Aniline site, as pictured prior to development in 2010

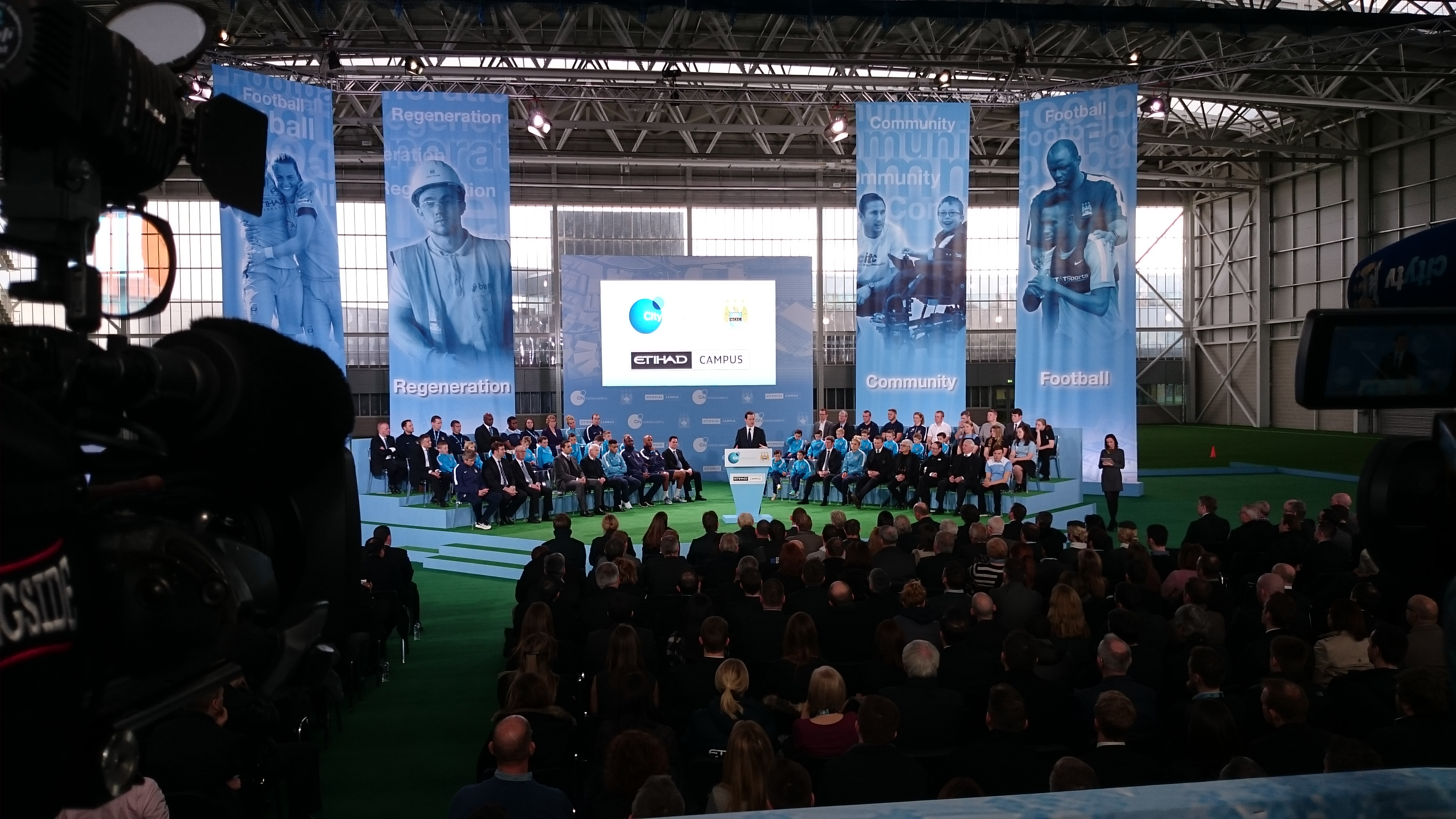
The opening of Manchester City's new training facility at the Etihad Campus in December 2014

The initial plans released in September 2011 generated over 7000 responses from local residents, in person and online. The plans were met with a 97% approval rating from respondents. The plans were enthusiastically backed in December 2011 by Manchester City Council, and approved by the government in August 2012.

=== Phase 1 – City Football Academy (2014) ===
Moved from its current Carrington Training Centre complex to east Manchester nearby the City of Manchester Stadium. The new training complex is based on AC Milan's Milanello training complex, which is recognised to be one of top training complexes in world football.

Construction contract was signed on 14 September 2012 with work on the facility to begin immediately. Employing local people, procuring building materials from regional companies in the North West England and the addition of over 6000 new trees in east Manchester are centrepieces of the community and environmental benefits of the development.

=== Phase 2 – Stadium expansion (2014–present) ===
Phase 2 consisted of stadium capacity expansion. Feasibility studies conducted in 2011 showed that 2,000 more seats could be added to 49,805 without any change to the stadium structure. The South Stand and Pitch side was expanded with construction beginning in 2014 and concluded in time for the start of 2015–16 season, with around 7,000 extra seats being added. A £300 million redevelopment programme of the existing North Stand is approved. It entails the construction of a new hotel, covered fan park for 6,000 people and increased net capacity to 61,474 (allowing for seats blocked off for fan separation), Construction commenced in 2023 and be completed by the end of 2026. The second tier at the north end of the stadium will be extended with a further 7,900 seats; while a 'Skybar', linked to the hotel and with premium seating for 450, will surmount the whole. The renovations are hoped to be completed by UEFA Euro 2028.

=== Phase 3 – Leisure attraction (2024) ===
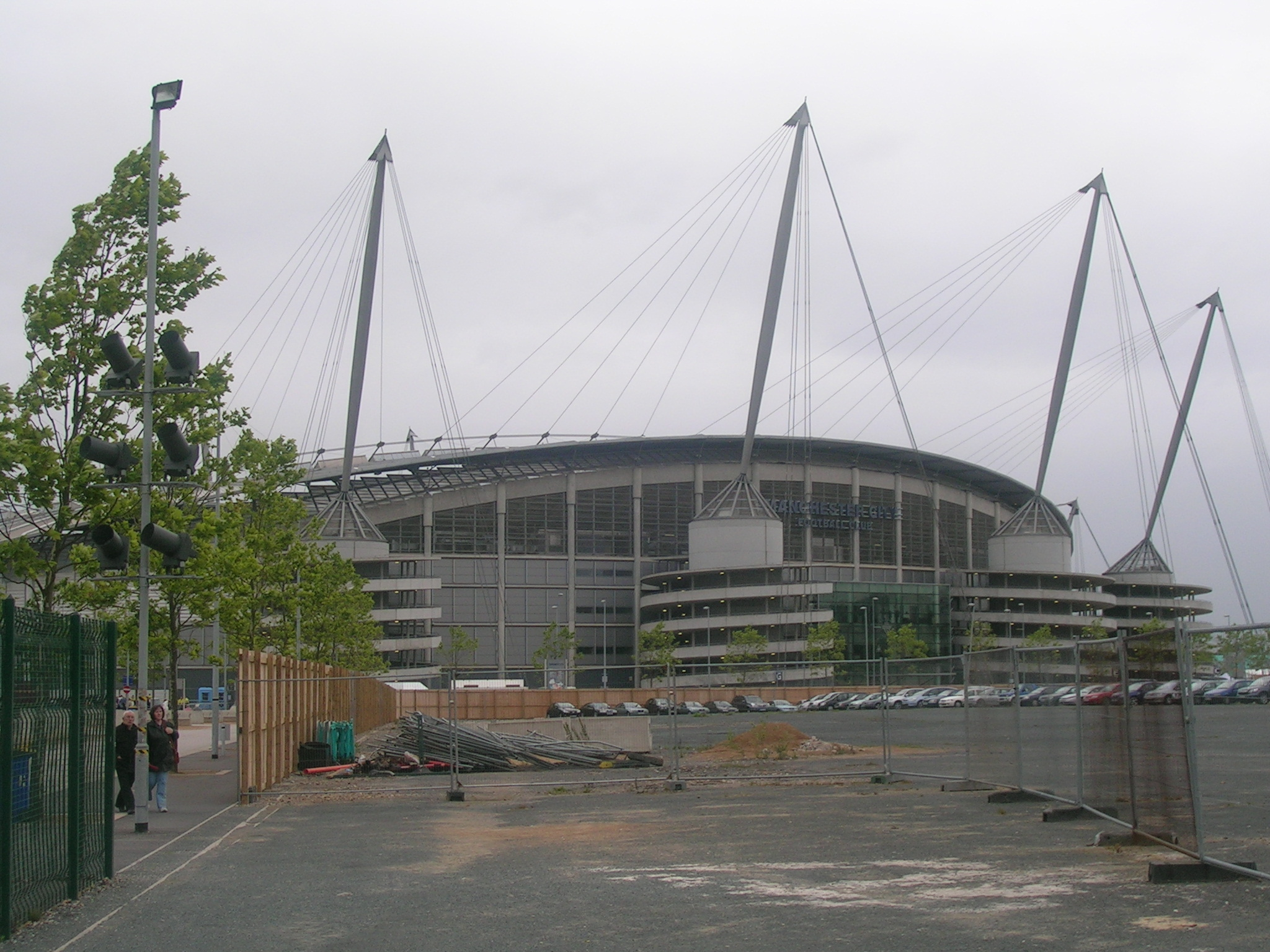
Empty land surrounding the stadium has been envisaged for development since 2002.

Phase 3 would focus on developing the land immediately adjacent to the Etihad Stadium. The adjoining land around the stadium is frequently called the Collar Site. This site was the selected location over sites in London and Blackpool for the Supercasino in 2007 – but the proposal was later abandoned amid controversy over the regeneration benefits. The Collar Site is on what was once Bradford Colliery. Remediation work to cap disused mine shafts was completed in 2011 so that the site could be used for property development. Manchester City Council conveyed their desire in 2010 to have a destination leisure and tourism attraction of "national significance".

Building started in 2021 of a new 23,500 capacity indoor arena which could be used for events such as MMA, concerts, basketball and other events. The venue, called the Co-op Live Arena is a partnership venture between the Oak View Group and City Football Group and was opened on 14 May 2024. On 4 March 2026, the entertainment destination at Etihad Campus was officially named Medlock Square. On 7 September 2026, the Radisson Blu Medlock hotel opened on the campus.

== Transport ==
=== Tram ===
The campus is served by the Metrolink tram stops at Etihad Campus, serving the stadium, and Velopark, serving the CFA, which both opened in February 2013.

=== Rail ===
To match demand for a 365-day attraction, a 60,000 larger stadium, more non-footballing events and revitalised economical activity in east Manchester – Manchester City Council have considered opening a station on the railway line next the Regional Athletics Arena to provide further capacity. A new Eastlands Railway Station would sit on the Ashton, Stalybridge and Liverpool Junction Railway – a short line linking Ardwick to Miles Platting. The line is still used by freight but not by passenger services which stopped such services in 1995.

The line would have national connections and link the Etihad Campus to Manchester Victoria and Manchester Piccadilly if the southern junction was rebuilt. A new Eastlands Railway station was discussed as part of the Northern Hub phase 2 plan in June 2010.

== See also ==
- City Football Academy (disambiguation)
- Marinos Town (Yokohama)
