= 2018–19 Perth Glory FC season =

Perth Glory
2018–19 season
- Chairman: Tony Sage
- Manager: Tony Popovic
- Stadium: HBF Park, Perth
- A-League: Premiers
- A-League Finals Series: Runners-up
- FFA Cup: Round of 32
- Top goalscorer: League: Andy Keogh (15 goals); All: Andy Keogh (15 goals)
- Highest home attendance: 17,856 vs Melbourne Victory (30 March 2019)
- Lowest home attendance: 7,213 vs Adelaide United (23 January 2019)
- Average home league attendance: 10,360
Home colours	Away colours	Third colours

The 2018–19 Perth Glory FC season was the club's 22nd season since its establishment in 1996. The club participated in the A-League for the 14th time and the FFA Cup for the 5th time.

== Players ==
=== Squad information ===
Note: Flags indicate national team as defined under FIFA eligibility rules; some limited exceptions apply. Players may hold more than one non-FIFA nationality.

No.	Pos.	Nation	Player
1	GK	AUS	Tando Velaphi
2	DF	AUS	Alex Grant
3	DF	AUS	Jason Davidson
4	DF	AUS	Shane Lowry
5	DF	AUS	Ivan Franjic
6	DF	AUS	Dino Djulbic
7	FW	AUS	Joel Chianese
9	FW	IRL	Andy Keogh
11	FW	AUS	Brendon Santalab
13	DF	AUS	Matthew Spiranovic
14	FW	AUS	Chris Harold

No.	Pos.	Nation	Player
15	MF	AUS	Brandon Wilson
16	DF	AUS	Tomislav Mrcela
17	MF	ESP	Diego Castro (Captain)
19	MF	AUS	Chris Ikonomidis
20	MF	AUS	Jake Brimmer
21	FW	AUS	Jacob Italiano
22	MF	POR	Fábio Ferreira
23	DF	AUS	Scott Neville
27	MF	ESP	Juande
33	GK	AUS	Liam Reddy
88	MF	AUS	Neil Kilkenny

== Transfers ==
=== Transfers in ===
No.	Position	Player	Transferred from	Type/fee	Contract length	Date	Ref.
5	DF	Ivan Franjic		Free transfer	2 years	31 May 2018	
16	DF	Tomislav Mrcela		Free transfer	2 years	14 June 2018	
11	FW	Brendon Santalab	Western Sydney Wanderers	Free transfer	1 year	19 June 2018	
13	DF	Matthew Spiranovic		Free transfer	1 year	22 June 2018	
1	GK	Tando Velaphi	Wellington Phoenix	Free transfer	1 year	2 July 2018	
22	MF	(Portugal) Fábio Ferreria		Free transfer	1 year	10 July 2018	
3	DF	Jason Davidson	(Croatia) Rijeka	Free transfer	1 year	13 July 2018	
27	MF	(Spain) Juande	(Italy) Spezia	Free transfer	2 years	19 July 2018	
19	MF	Chris Ikonomidis	(Italy) Lazio	Free transfer	3 years	11 September 2018	

=== Transfers out ===
No.	Position	Player	Transferred to	Type/fee	Date	Ref.
18	MF	(Spain) Andreu		Mutual contract termination	19 April 2018	
16	DF	(England) Joseph Mills		Mutual contract termination	19 April 2018	
29	DF	Jeremy Walker		Mutual contract termination	19 April 2018	
22	FW	Adam Taggart	Brisbane Roar	Free transfer	30 April 2018	
8	MF	(Spain) Xavi Torres	(Spain) Elche	Free transfer	1 August 2018	

=== Contract extensions ===
No.	Name	Position	Duration	Date	Ref.
2	Alex Grant	Defender	2 years	24 April 2018	
4	Shane Lowry	Defender	1 year	24 April 2018	
33	Liam Reddy	Goalkeeper	1 year	24 April 2018	
14	Chris Harold	Winger	2 years	26 April 2018	
7	Joel Chianese	Striker	1 year	26 April 2018	
21	Jacob Italiano	Forward	1 year	26 April 2018	
88	Neil Kilkenny	Central midfielder	3 years	27 April 2018	
15	Brandon Wilson	Central midfielder	2 years	29 May 2018	
9	(Republic of Ireland) Andy Keogh	Striker	1 year	6 March 2019	
7	Joel Chianese	Striker	1 year	7 March 2019	
33	Liam Reddy	Goalkeeper	2 years	8 March 2019	
20	Jake Brimmer	Midfielder	2 years	12 March 2019	
3	Jason Davidson	Left-back	1 year	19 March 2019	
17	(Spain) Diego Castro	Winger	2 years	23 April 2019	

=== Technical staff ===
Position	Name
Manager	(Australia) Tony Popovic
Assistant managers	(Australia) Hayden Foxe (Australia) Richard Garcia
Youth Team Manager	(Australia) Richard Garcia
Goalkeeping coach	(Australia) Danny Milosevic
Strength & Conditioning Coach	(Australia) Toby Horak
Physiotherapist	(Australia) Ian Austin

== Squad statistics ==
=== Appearances and goals ===
N	Pos.	Nat.	Name	Total					A-League					A-League Finals Series					FFA Cup
N	Pos.	Nat.	Name	Apps	Goals	Yellow card	Second yellow card	Red card	Apps	Goals	Yellow card	Second yellow card	Red card	Apps	Goals	Yellow card	Second yellow card	Red card	Apps	Goals	Yellow card	Second yellow card	Red card
1	GK	(Australia)	Tando Velaphi	0	0	0	0	0	0+0	0	0	0	0	0+0	0	0	0	0	0+0	0	0	0	0
2	DF	(Australia)	Alex Grant	12	0	2	0	0	11+0	0	2	0	0	0+0	0	0	0	0	1+0	0	0	0	0
3	DF	(Australia)	Jason Davidson	28	2	4	0	0	25+1	2	4	0	0	2+0	0	0	0	0	0+0	0	0	0	0
4	DF	(Australia)	Shane Lowry	27	2	9	0	0	24+0	2	7	0	0	2+0	0	1	0	0	1+0	0	1	0	0
5	DF	(Australia)	Ivan Franjic	30	2	3	0	0	25+2	2	3	0	0	2+0	0	0	0	0	1+0	0	0	0	0
6	DF	(Australia)	Dino Djulbic	23	1	3	0	0	17+3	1	1	0	0	2+0	0	1	0	0	1+0	0	1	0	0
7	FW	(Australia)	Joel Chianese	28	5	2	0	0	19+7	5	2	0	0	1+1	0	0	0	0	0+0	0	0	0	0
9	FW	(Republic of Ireland)	Andy Keogh	28	15	3	0	0	21+5	15	3	0	0	1+1	0	0	0	0	0+0	0	0	0	0
11	FW	(Australia)	Brendon Santalab	19	2	4	0	0	3+13	2	3	0	0	0+2	0	1	0	0	0+1	0	0	0	0
13	DF	(Australia)	Matthew Spiranovic	15	0	3	0	0	13+0	0	3	0	0	2+0	0	0	0	0	0+0	0	0	0	0
14	FW	(Australia)	Chris Harold	1	0	0	0	0	0+1	0	0	0	0	0+0	0	0	0	0	0+0	0	0	0	0
15	MF	(Australia)	Brandon Wilson	8	0	0	0	0	4+3	0	0	0	0	0+0	0	0	0	0	1+0	0	0	0	0
16	DF	(Australia)	Tomislav Mrcela	12	0	0	0	1	12+0	0	0	0	1	0+0	0	0	0	0	0+0	0	0	0	0
17	MF	(Spain)	Diego Castro	23	9	5	0	0	13+7	7	4	0	0	2+0	2	1	0	0	0+1	0	0	0	0
18	MF	(Australia)	Daniel Stynes	0	0	0	0	0	0+0	0	0	0	0	0+0	0	0	0	0	0+0	0	0	0	0
19	MF	(Australia)	Chris Ikonomidis	20	9	2	0	0	17+1	9	2	0	0	2+0	0	0	0	0	0+0	0	0	0	0
20	MF	(Australia)	Jake Brimmer	22	0	1	0	0	6+13	0	1	0	0	0+2	0	0	0	0	0+1	0	0	0	0
21	MF	(Australia)	Jacob Italiano	3	0	0	0	0	1+1	0	0	0	0	0+0	0	0	0	0	1+0	0	0	0	0
22	MF	(Portugal)	Fábio Ferreria	14	2	0	0	0	6+7	2	0	0	0	0+0	0	0	0	0	1+0	0	0	0	0
23	DF	(Australia)	Scott Neville	23	1	3	0	0	7+13	0	2	0	0	0+2	1	0	0	0	1+0	0	1	0	0
24	MF	(Australia)	Callum Timmins	0	0	0	0	0	0+0	0	0	0	0	0+0	0	0	0	0	0+0	0	0	0	0
25	DF	(Australia)	Walter Scott	0	0	0	0	0	0+0	0	0	0	0	0+0	0	0	0	0	0+0	0	0	0	0
26	FW	(Australia)	Jamal Reiners	0	0	0	0	0	0+0	0	0	0	0	0+0	0	0	0	0	0+0	0	0	0	0
27	MF	(Spain)	Juande	22	1	6	0	0	20+0	1	5	0	0	2+0	0	1	0	0	0+0	0	0	0	0
29	MF	(Australia)	Kristian Popovic	2	0	0	0	0	0+2	0	0	0	0	0+0	0	0	0	0	0+0	0	0	0	0
33	GK	(Australia)	Liam Reddy	30	0	3	0	0	27+0	0	3	0	0	2+0	0	0	0	0	1+0	0	0	0	0
34	FW	(Australia)	Yagoub Mustafa	1	0	0	0	0	0+0	0	0	0	0	0+0	0	0	0	0	1+0	0	0	0	0
36	MF	(Australia)	Henry Hore	0	0	0	0	0	0+0	0	0	0	0	0+0	0	0	0	0	0+0	0	0	0	0
40	GK	(Australia)	Jackson Lee	0	0	0	0	0	0+0	0	0	0	0	0+0	0	0	0	0	0+0	0	0	0	0
88	MF	(Australia)	Neil Kilkenny	29	6	5	0	0	26+0	6	4	0	0	2+0	0	1	0	0	1+0	0	0	0	0

- Last updated: 19 May 2019
- Source: au.soccerway.com
- (yellow card) = Number of bookings; (second yellow card) = Number of sending offs after a second yellow card; (red card) = Number of sending offs by a direct red card.

== Pre-season and friendlies ==
11 July 2018	Perth SC (Australia)	0–3	(Australia) Perth Glory	Perth, Australia
19:00 AWST		Report	Italiano 20'; Keogh 44'; Timmins 88'	Stadium: Dorrien Gardens; Attendance: ~600

18 July 2018	Gwelup Croatia (Australia)	0–6	(Australia) Perth Glory	Perth, Australia
19:00 AWST		Report	Keogh 5'; Franjic 18'; Harold 56', 89'; Italiano 71'; Santalab 80'	Stadium: Dorrien Gardens; Attendance: ~450

23 July 2018	Perth Glory (Australia)	0–1	(England) Chelsea	Perth, Australia
19:30 AWST		Report	Pedro 5'	Stadium: Optus Stadium; Attendance: 55,522; Referee: Shaun Evans

1 August 2018	WA State Team (Western Australia)	2–5	(Australia) Perth Glory	Perth, Australia
19:00 AWST	Saldaris 79'; Sinclair 90+1'	Report	Davidson 5'; Castro 12'; Brimmer 42'; Mustafa 59'; Harold 63'	Stadium: Perth Plasterboard Centre Stadium; Attendance: ~400

11 August 2018 Symposium Cup	Sarawak FA (Malaysia)	1–7	(Australia) Perth Glory	Kuching, Malaysia
	Mateo 58'	Report	Castro 26'; Davidson 27', 42'; Sabri 27' (o.g.); Dau 67'; Hore 73'; Santalab 90'	Stadium: Stadium Negeri; Referee: Mohammed Zamzaidi Katimin

15 August 2018	Sarawak State Team (Malaysia)	0–7	(Australia) Perth Glory	Kuching, Malaysia
		Report	Castro 2' (pen.), 36'; Farah 19', 26'; Dau 22'; Ferreria 40'; Mustafa 72'

6 September 2018	Inglewood United (Australia)	0–7	(Australia) Perth Glory	Perth, Australia
		Report	Santalab 4', 16', 33'; Ferreria 31', 42'; Castro 38'; Harold 55'	Stadium: Perth Plasterboard Centre Stadium

13 September 2018 Challenge Cup	WA State Team (Western Australia)	1–2	(Australia) Perth Glory	Perth, Australia
	Kay 73'	Report	Mrcela 56'; O'Connell 85' (o.g.)	Stadium: Dalmatinac Park

19 September 2018	Adelaide United (Australia)	2–2	(Australia) Perth Glory	Adelaide, Australia
	Ilsø 45' (pen.); Boland 45+1'	Report	Elsey 11' (o.g.); Mrcela 44'	Stadium: Coopers Stadium; Attendance: 0 (behind closed doors)

26 September 2018	Rockingham City (Australia)	0–7	(Australia) Perth Glory	Perth, Australia
		Report	Harold 8'; Keogh 45'; Mustafa 47', 50', 58'; Domfeh 80'; Farah 84'	Stadium: Lark Hill Sports Complex

7 October 2018	Melbourne City (Australia)	1–0	(Australia) Perth Glory	Melbourne, Australia
	Vidosic 17'	Report		Stadium: City Football Academy; Attendance: 0 (behind closed doors)

== Competitions ==
=== Overall ===
Competition	Started round	Final position / round	First match	Last match
A-League	—	Premiers	21 October 2018	28 April 2019
A-League Finals	Semi-finals	Runners-up	10 May 2019	19 May 2019
FFA Cup	Round of 32	Round of 32	7 August 2018	7 August 2018

=== A-League ===
==== League table ====
Pos	Team	Pld	W	D	L	GF	GA	GD	Pts	Qualification
1	Perth Glory	27	18	6	3	56	23	+33	60	Qualification for 2020 AFC Champions League group stage and Finals series (Note: The top two teams enter the Finals series at the semi-finals, while the teams ranked third to sixth enter the Finals series at the elimination-finals.)
2	Sydney FC (C)	27	16	4	7	43	29	+14	52	Qualification for 2020 AFC Champions League group stage and Finals series
3	Melbourne Victory	27	15	5	7	50	32	+18	50	Qualification for 2020 AFC Champions League preliminary round 2 and Finals series
4	Adelaide United	27	12	8	7	37	32	+5	44	Qualification for Finals series
5	Melbourne City	27	11	7	9	39	32	+7	40	Qualification for Finals series
6	Wellington Phoenix (Note: Wellington Phoenix cannot qualify for the AFC Champions League as they are not recognised as an AFC club.)	27	11	7	9	46	43	+3	40	Qualification for Finals series
7	Newcastle Jets	27	10	5	12	40	36	+4	35	
8	Western Sydney Wanderers	27	6	6	15	42	54	−12	24	
9	Brisbane Roar	27	4	6	17	38	71	−33	18	
10	Central Coast Mariners	27	3	4	20	31	70	−39	13	

Source: A-Leagues
Rules for classification: 1) points; 2) goal difference; 3) number of goals scored.
(C) Champions

==== Results summary ====
Overall								Home						Away					
Pld	W	D	L	GF	GA	GD	Pts	W	D	L	GF	GA	GD	W	D	L	GF	GA	GD
27	18	6	3	56	23	+33	60	10	2	2	30	12	+18	8	4	1	26	11	+15

Last updated: 7 April 2019.
Source: ultimatealeague.com

==== Results by round ====
Round	1	2	3	4	5	6	7	8	9	10	11	12	13	14	15	16	17	18	19	20	21	22	23	24	25	26	27
Ground	H	A	H	A	H	A	H	A	H	A	A	H	H	A	H	H	H	A	H	A	A	A	H	A	H	A	H
Result	D	W	W	W	W	D	W	W	L	W	W	W	W	D	D	W	W	W	W	D	D	W	L	W	W	L	W
Position	4	2	2	1	1	1	1	1	1	1	1	1	1	1	1	1	1	1	1	1	1	1	1	1	1	1	1

Updated to match(es) played on 28 April 2019. Source: ultimatealeague.com
A = Away; H = Home; W = Win; D = Draw; L = Loss

==== Matches ====
Win Draw Loss

21 October 2018 1	Perth Glory	1–1	Western Sydney Wanderers	Perth
16:00 AWST	Keogh 26'	Report	Bonevacia 65'	Stadium: nib Stadium; Attendance: 10,206; Referee: Peter Green

28 October 2018 2	Melbourne Victory	2–3	Perth Glory	Melbourne
19:00 AEDT	Antonis 47'; Roux 87'	Report	Chianese 8'; Keogh 23'; Ikonomidis 90+3'	Stadium: AAMI Park; Attendance: 17,219; Referee: Jonathan Barreiro

3 November 2018 3	Perth Glory	2–1	Brisbane Roar	Perth
19:00 AWST	Keogh 15'; O'Toole 63' (o.g.)	Report	Taggart 84' (pen.)	Stadium: nib Stadium; Attendance: 9,446; Referee: Daniel Elder

11 November 2018 4	Adelaide United	0–2	Perth Glory	Adelaide
16:30 ACDT		Report	Keogh 73'; Ikonomidis 90'	Stadium: Coopers Stadium; Attendance: 9,705; Referee: Chris Beath

25 November 2018 5	Perth Glory	3–2	Central Coast Mariners	Perth
16:00 AWST	Ikonomidis 12', 90+5'; Lowry 61'	Report	Mrcela 36' (o.g.); O'Neill 64'	Stadium: nib Stadium; Attendance: 10,417; Referee: Jarred Gillett

2 December 2018 6	Wellington Phoenix	1–1	Perth Glory	Wellington
19:00 NZDT	Krishna 44'	Report	Castro 82'	Stadium: Westpac Stadium; Attendance: 4,829; Referee: Adam Kersey

8 December 2018 7	Perth Glory	1–0	Melbourne City	Perth
19:00 AWST	Ikonomidis 43'	Report		Stadium: nib Stadium; Attendance: 8,489; Referee: Peter Green

16 December 2018 8	Newcastle Jets	0–2	Perth Glory	Newcastle
17:00 AEDT		Report	Kilkenny 3' (pen.); Davidson 25'	Stadium: McDonald Jones Stadium; Attendance: 6,701; Referee: Stephan Lucas

21 December 2018 9	Perth Glory	1–2	Sydney FC	Perth
18:00 AWST	Ikonomidis 90'	Report	Le Fondre 18'; De Silva 87'	Stadium: nib Stadium; Attendance: 10,356; Referee: Jonathan Barreiro

31 December 2018 10	Central Coast Mariners	1–4	Perth Glory	Gosford
19:00 AEDT	Murray 77'	Report	Keogh 3', 90+2'; Ferreira 23', 41'	Stadium: Central Coast Stadium; Attendance: 6,048; Referee: Kurt Ams

6 January 2019 11	Brisbane Roar	2–4	Perth Glory	Brisbane
18:00 AEST	Taggart 22', 40'	Report	Kilkenny 59' (pen.), 81' (pen.); Reardon 85' (o.g.); Keogh 87'	Stadium: Suncorp Stadium; Attendance: 9,429; Referee: Adam Kersey

9 January 2019 12	Perth Glory	3–1	Sydney FC	Perth
19:00 AWST	Chianese 13', 24'; Santalab 45+3'	Report	Le Fondre 68'	Stadium: HBF Park; Attendance: 9,521; Referee: Jarred Gillett

13 January 2019 13	Perth Glory	4–3	Western Sydney Wanderers	Perth
17:00 AWST	Castro 70'; Franjic 79'; Keogh 82'; Juande 86' (pen.)	Report	Yeboah 39'; Bonevacia 67'; Majok 77'	Stadium: HBF Park; Attendance: 8,945; Referee: Kurt Ams

19 January 2019 14	Melbourne City	0–0	Perth Glory	Melbourne
19:50 AEDT		Report		Stadium: AAMI Park; Attendance: 6,055; Referee: Shaun Evans

23 January 2019 15	Perth Glory	0–0	Adelaide United	Perth
19:00 AWST		Report		Stadium: HBF Park; Attendance: 7,123; Referee: Adam Kersey

27 January 2019 16	Perth Glory	2–0	Newcastle Jets	Perth
17:00 AWST	Keogh 16'; Kilkenny 47'	Report		Stadium: HBF Park; Attendance: 11,393; Referee: Alex King

2 February 2019 17	Perth Glory	3–0	Wellington Phoenix	Perth
19:00 AWST	Lowry 19'; Ikonomidis 35'; Keogh 64'	Report		Stadium: HBF Park; Attendance: 9,148; Referee: Shaun Evans

10 February 2019 18	Melbourne Victory	1–2	Perth Glory	Melbourne
17:00 AEDT	Barbarouses 78'	Report	Kilkenny 61' (pen.); Castro 69'	Stadium: AAMI Park; Attendance: 25,071; Referee: Jarred Gillett

16 February 2019 19	Perth Glory	4–0	Brisbane Roar	Perth
19:00 AWST	Davidson 19'; Keogh 35', 45+3'; Castro 54'	Report		Stadium: HBF Park; Attendance: 10,831; Referee: Shaun Evans

24 February 2019 20	Western Sydney Wanderers	1–1	Perth Glory	Sydney
17:00 AEDT	Elrich 90+5'	Report	Ikonomidis 23'	Stadium: Spotless Stadium; Attendance: 7,181; Referee: Jonathan Barreiro

3 March 2019 21	Melbourne City	2–2	Perth Glory	Melbourne
17:00 AEDT	Maclaren 26', 35' (pen.)	Report	Chianese 84'; Castro 90+1'	Stadium: AAMI Park; Attendance: 7,746; Referee: Alex King

15 March 2019 22	Adelaide United	0–2	Perth Glory	Adelaide
19:20 ACDT		Report	Castro 35'; Keogh 70'	Stadium: Coopers Stadium; Attendance: 7,853; Referee: Peter Green

30 March 2019 23	Perth Glory	0–2	Melbourne Victory	Perth
22:00 AEDT		Report	Toivonen 25'; Honda 67' (pen.)	Stadium: HBF Park; Attendance: 17,856; Referee: Shaun Evans

7 April 2019 24	Central Coast Mariners	0–3	Perth Glory	Gosford
19:00 AEST		Report	Chianese 12'; Djulbic 29'; Kilkenny 57' (pen.)	Stadium: Central Coast Stadium; Attendance: 3,939; Referee: Daniel Elder

14 April 2019 25	Perth Glory	1–0	Newcastle Jets	Perth
17:00 AWST	Franjic 65'	Report		Stadium: HBF Park; Attendance: 11,349; Referee: Kurt Ams

18 April 2019 26	Sydney FC	1–0	Perth Glory	Sydney
19:50 AEST	Le Fondre 37'	Report		Stadium: Jubilee Oval; Attendance: 11,227; Referee: Chris Beath

28 April 2019 27	Perth Glory	5–0	Wellington Phoenix	Perth
17:00 AWST	Keogh 24', 31'; Castro 51'; Ikonomidis 65'; Santalab 83'	Report		Stadium: HBF Park; Attendance: 9,875; Referee: Stephen Lucas

==== Finals series ====
10 May 2019 Semi-final	Perth Glory	3–3 (a.e.t.) (5–4 p)	Adelaide United	Perth
18:30 AWST	Castro 29', 74'; Neville 104'	Report	Diawara 81'; Kitto 90+4'; Marrone 115'	Stadium: HBF Park; Attendance: 17,868; Referee: Alex King
	Penalties
	(penalty scored) Juande; (penalty missed) Castro; (penalty scored) Santalab; (penalty scored) Reddy; (penalty scored) Brimmer; (penalty missed) Davidson; (penalty missed) Lowry; (penalty scored) Chianese		(penalty scored) Goodwin; (penalty scored) Elsey; (penalty scored) Lia; (penalty missed) Isaías; (penalty scored) Halloran; (penalty missed) Diawara; (penalty missed) Mileusnic; (penalty missed) Konstandopoulos

19 May 2019 Grand Final	Perth Glory	0–0 (a.e.t.) (1–4 p)	Sydney FC	Perth
16:30 AWST		Report		Stadium: Optus Stadium; Attendance: 56,371; Referee: Shaun Evans
	Penalties
	(penalty scored) Juande; (penalty missed) Keogh; (penalty missed) Santalab		(penalty scored) Le Fondre; (penalty scored) O'Neill; (penalty scored) Grant; (penalty scored) Ghoochannejhad

=== FFA Cup ===
7 August 2018 Round of 32	Perth Glory (Western Australia)	0–1	(Victoria (state)) Melbourne Victory	Perth
18:30 AWST		Report	Barbarouses 38'	Stadium: Dorrien Gardens; Attendance: 1,754; Referee: Shaun Evans
