= 2017–18 Perth Glory FC season =

Perth Glory
2017–18 season
- Chairman: Tony Sage
- Manager: Kenny Lowe
- Stadium: nib Stadium, Perth
- A-League: 8th
- FFA Cup: Round of 32
- Top goalscorer: Adam Taggart (8 goals)
- Highest home attendance: 13,565 vs Melbourne Victory; 19 November 2017
- Lowest home attendance: 7,277 vs Central Coast Mariners; 10 March 2018
- Average home league attendance: 9,186
Home colours	Away colours	Third colours

The 2017–18 Perth Glory FC season was the club's 21st season since its establishment in 1996. The club participated in the A-League for the 13th time and the FFA Cup for the 4th time.

== Players ==
=== Squad information ===
Note: Flags indicate national team as defined under FIFA eligibility rules; some limited exceptions apply. Players may hold more than one non-FIFA nationality.

No.	Pos.	Nation	Player
2	DF	AUS	Alex Grant
4	DF	AUS	Shane Lowry
7	FW	AUS	Joel Chianese
8	MF	ESP	Xavi Torres
9	FW	IRL	Andy Keogh (Captain)
13	GK	AUS	Nick Feely
14	FW	AUS	Chris Harold
15	MF	AUS	Brandon Wilson
16	DF	ENG	Joseph Mills
17	MF	ESP	Diego Castro
18	MF	ESP	Andreu

No.	Pos.	Nation	Player
19	FW	AUS	Joe Knowles
20	MF	AUS	Jake Brimmer
21	FW	AUS	Jamal Reiners
22	FW	AUS	Adam Taggart
23	DF	AUS	Scott Neville
25	MF	AUS	Daniel Stynes
29	DF	AUS	Jeremy Walker (Injury replacement)
33	GK	AUS	Liam Reddy
66	DF	AUS	Dino Djulbic
88	MF	AUS	Neil Kilkenny

=== From youth squad ===
N	Pos.	Nat.	Name	Age	Notes
28	FW	(Australia)	Joe Knowles	20	
25	MF	(Australia)	Daniel Stynes	19	

=== Transfers in ===
No.	Position	Player	Transferred from	Type/fee	Contract length	Date	Ref.
23	DF	Scott Neville	Western Sydney Wanderers	Free transfer	3 years	25 April 2017	
5	DF	Jacob Poscoliero	Central Coast Mariners	Free transfer	1 year	18 May 2017	
6	MF	Mitch Nichols		Free transfer	2 years	23 June 2017	
20	MF	Jake Brimmer		Free transfer		31 July 2017	
18	MF	(Spain) Andreu		Free transfer	1 year	9 August 2017	
8	MF	(Spain) Xavi Torres		Free transfer	1 year	25 August 2017	
11	FW	Mitchell Mallia	(Australia) Blacktown City	Injury replacement		11 October 2017	
29	DF	Jeremy Walker	(Australia) Green Gully	Injury replacement		11 October 2017	
66	DF	Dino Djulbic		Free transfer	1.5 years	22 January 2018	
88	MF	Neil Kilkenny		Free transfer	6 months	25 January 2018	

=== Transfers out ===
No.	Position	Player	Transferred to	Type/fee	Date	Ref.
23	FW	Kosta Petratos	Newcastle Jets	Free transfer	25 January 2017	
6	DF	Dino Djulbic		End of contract	14 May 2017	
10	MF	(Serbia) Nebojša Marinković		End of contract	14 May 2017	
11	MF	Richard Garcia		Retired	14 May 2017	
18	MF	Mitchell Oxborrow		End of contract	14 May 2017	
20	DF	Aryn Williams		End of contract	14 May 2017	
26	DF	(Romania) Lucian Goian		End of contract	14 May 2017	
30	GK	Jordan Thurtell		End of contract	14 May 2017	
5	DF	Rhys Williams	Melbourne Victory	Free transfer	15 May 2017	
19	DF	Josh Risdon	Western Sydney Wanderers	Free transfer	16 May 2017	
8	MF	Rostyn Griffiths	(Uzbekistan) Pakhtakor Tashkent	Undisclosed	1 August 2017	
11	FW	Mitchell Mallia		End of contract	19 December 2017	
5	DF	Jacob Poscoliero		Mutual contract termination	30 January 2018	
3	DF	Marc Warren		Mutual contract termination	20 February 2018	
6	MF	Mitch Nichols		Mutual contract termination	20 February 2018	

=== Contract extensions ===
No.	Name	Position	Duration	Date	Ref.
7	Joel Chianese	Striker	1 year	14 May 2017	
13	Nick Feely	Goalkeeper	1 year	14 May 2017	
17	(Spain) Diego Castro	Winger	1 year	14 May 2017	
33	Liam Reddy	Goalkeeper	1 year	14 May 2017	
3	Marc Warren	Left back	1 year	21 May 2017	
9	(Republic of Ireland) Andy Keogh	Striker	1 year	30 May 2017	
29	Jeremy Walker	Right-back		19 December 2017	
2	Alex Grant	Defender	1 year	24 April 2018	
4	Shane Lowry	Defender	1 year	24 April 2018	
33	Liam Reddy	Goalkeeper	1 year	24 April 2018	

=== Technical staff ===
Position	Name
Manager	(England) Kenny Lowe
Assistant manager	(England) Andrew Ord
Youth Team Manager	(Australia) John Gibson
Goalkeeping coach	(Australia) Danny Milosevic
Strength & Conditioning Coach	(Australia) Toby Horak
Physiotherapist	(Australia) Chris Hutchinson

== Statistics ==
=== Squad statistics ===
N	Pos.	Nat.	Name	Total					A-League					FFA Cup
N	Pos.	Nat.	Name	Apps	Goals	Yellow card	Second yellow card	Red card	Apps	Goals	Yellow card	Second yellow card	Red card	Apps	Goals	Yellow card	Second yellow card	Red card
2	DF	(Australia)	Alex Grant	21	0	4	0	0	17+3	0	4	0	0	1+0	0	0	0	0
4	DF	(Australia)	Shane Lowry	21	1	7	0	0	19+1	1	7	0	0	1+0	0	0	0	0
7	FW	(Australia)	Joel Chianese	13	2	3	0	0	10+2	2	2	0	0	1+0	0	1	0	0
8	MF	(Spain)	Xavi Torres	24	4	4	0	0	23+1	4	4	0	0	0+0	0	0	0	0
9	FW	(Republic of Ireland)	Andy Keogh	25	6	4	0	0	23+1	6	4	0	0	1+0	0	0	0	0
13	GK	(Australia)	Nick Feely	2	0	0	0	0	1+1	0	0	0	0	0+0	0	0	0	0
14	FW	(Australia)	Chris Harold	25	2	3	0	0	16+8	2	3	0	0	1+0	0	0	0	0
15	MF	(Australia)	Brandon Wilson	16	0	2	0	0	9+6	0	2	0	0	1+0	0	0	0	0
16	DF	(England)	Joseph Mills	23	0	5	0	0	22+0	0	5	0	0	1+0	0	0	0	0
17	MF	(Spain)	Diego Castro	21	7	3	0	0	20+1	7	3	0	0	0+0	0	0	0	0
18	MF	(Spain)	Andreu	17	0	3	0	0	13+4	0	3	0	0	0+0	0	0	0	0
19	FW	(Australia)	Joe Knowles	10	1	1	0	0	4+5	1	1	0	0	0+1	0	0	0	0
20	MF	(Australia)	Jake Brimmer	19	0	0	0	0	4+14	0	0	0	0	1+0	0	0	0	0
21	FW	(Australia)	Jamal Reiners	0	0	0	0	0	0+0	0	0	0	0	0+0	0	0	0	0
22	FW	(Australia)	Adam Taggart	15	8	3	0	0	9+5	8	3	0	0	1+0	0	0	0	0
23	DF	(Australia)	Scott Neville	20	1	3	0	0	19+0	1	3	0	0	1+0	0	0	0	0
24	MF	(Australia)	Callum Timmins	3	0	0	0	0	0+3	0	0	0	0	0+0	0	0	0	0
25	MF	(Australia)	Daniel Stynes	1	0	0	0	0	0+0	0	0	0	0	0+1	0	0	0	0
26	MF	(Australia)	Jacob Italiano	16	0	1	0	0	12+4	0	1	0	0	0+0	0	0	0	0
27	DF	(Australia)	Riley Warland	0	0	0	0	0	0+0	0	0	0	0	0+0	0	0	0	0
29	DF	(Australia)	Jeremy Walker	13	0	3	0	0	13+0	0	3	0	0	0+0	0	0	0	0
33	GK	(Australia)	Liam Reddy	27	0	1	0	1	26+0	0	1	0	1	1+0	0	0	0	0
34	FW	(Australia)	Yagoub Mustafa	1	0	0	0	0	0+1	0	0	0	0	0+0	0	0	0	0
37	DF	(Australia)	Walter Scott	2	0	0	0	0	1+1	0	0	0	0	0+0	0	0	0	0
66	DF	(Australia)	Dino Djulbic	8	0	2	0	0	7+1	0	2	0	0	0+0	0	0	0	0
88	MF	(Australia)	Neil Kilkenny	10	1	2	0	0	10+0	1	2	0	0	0+0	0	0	0	0
Players no longer at the club:
3	DF	(Australia)	Marc Warren	2	0	1	0	0	1+1	0	1	0	0	0+0	0	0	0	0
5	DF	(Australia)	Jacob Poscoliero	9	0	1	0	0	6+2	0	1	0	0	0+1	0	0	0	0
6	MF	(Australia)	Mitch Nichols	13	1	3	0	0	10+3	1	3	0	0	0+0	0	0	0	0
11	FW	(Australia)	Mitchell Mallia	6	1	1	0	0	1+5	1	1	0	0	0+0	0	0	0	0

- Last updated: 14 April 2018
- Source: au.soccerway.com
- (yellow card) = Number of bookings; (second yellow card) = Number of sending offs after a second yellow card; (red card) = Number of sending offs by a direct red card.

== Pre-season and friendlies ==
12 July 2017	Perth Glory (Australia)	Cancelled	(Chile) Audax Italiano	Perth, Australia
19:00 AWST		Cancellation		Stadium: nib Stadium

19 July 2017	Inglewood United (Australia)	3–1	(Australia) Perth Glory	Perth, Australia
19:00 AWST	K. Keogh 22'; Salmon 51'; Dau 82' (pen.)	Report	Italiano 90'	Stadium: Perth Plasterboard Centre Stadium

25 July 2017	Perth SC (Australia)	0–3	(Australia) Perth Glory	Perth, Australia
19:00 AWST		Report	Taggart 21', 32'; Keogh 64'	Stadium: Dorrien Gardens; Referee: Nico Hoyle

16 August 2017	Joondalup United (Australia)	0–1	(Australia) Perth Glory	Perth, Australia
18:30 AWST		Report	Taggart 47'	Stadium: Percy Doyle Reserve

30 August 2017	Cockburn City (Australia)	0–4	(Australia) Perth Glory	Perth, Australia
19:00 AWST		Report	Harold 2'; Chianese 54'; Nichols 62'; Italiano 78'	Stadium: Dalmatinac Park

13 September 2017	WA State Team (Western Australia)	1–1	(Australia) Perth Glory	Perth, Australia
19:00 AWST	Andres 28'	Report	Taggart 36'	Stadium: Hartfield Park; Attendance: 600+ Referee: David Bruce

20 September 2017	Sydney FC (Australia)	3–2	(Australia) Perth Glory	Sydney, Australia
	Buijs 29'; Bobô 32', 77'	Report	Warren 11'; Taggart 53'	Stadium: Leichhardt Oval; Attendance: 0 (behind closed doors); Referee: Kurt Ams

== Competitions ==
=== Overall ===
Competition	Started round	Final position / round	First match	Last match
A-League	—	8th	8 October 2017	14 April 2018
FFA Cup	Round of 32	Round of 32	1 August 2017	1 August 2017

=== A-League ===
==== League table ====
Pos	Team	Pld	W	D	L	GF	GA	GD	Pts	Qualification
1	Sydney FC	27	20	4	3	64	22	+42	64	Qualification for 2019 AFC Champions League group stage and Finals series
2	Newcastle Jets	27	15	5	7	57	37	+20	50	Qualification for 2019 AFC Champions League second preliminary round and Finals series
3	Melbourne City	27	13	4	10	41	33	+8	43	Qualification for Finals series
4	Melbourne Victory (C)	27	12	5	10	43	37	+6	41	Qualification for 2019 AFC Champions League group stage and Finals series
5	Adelaide United	27	11	6	10	36	38	−2	39	Qualification for Finals series
6	Brisbane Roar	27	10	5	12	33	40	−7	35	Qualification for Finals series
7	Western Sydney Wanderers	27	8	9	10	38	47	−9	33	
8	Perth Glory	27	10	2	15	37	50	−13	32	
9	Wellington Phoenix (Note: Wellington Phoenix cannot qualify for the AFC Champions League as they are not recognised as an AFC club.)	27	5	6	16	31	55	−24	21	
10	Central Coast Mariners	27	4	8	15	28	49	−21	20	

Source: A-Leagues
Rules for classification: 1) points; 2) goal difference; 3) number of goals scored.
(C) Champions

==== Results summary ====
Overall								Home						Away					
Pld	W	D	L	GF	GA	GD	Pts	W	D	L	GF	GA	GD	W	D	L	GF	GA	GD
27	10	2	15	37	50	−13	32	7	0	6	18	19	−1	3	2	9	19	31	−12

Last updated: 14 April 2018.
Source: ultimatealeague.com

==== Results by round ====
Round	1	2	3	4	5	6	7	8	9	10	11	12	13	14	15	16	17	18	19	20	21	22	23	24	25	26	27
Ground	A	A	H	A	H	A	H	A	A	H	H	A	A	H	H	A	A	H	A	A	H	H	A	H	H	A	H
Result	L	D	W	L	W	L	L	W	L	L	W	W	L	L	L	L	L	W	L	L	W	W	D	W	L	W	L
Position	7	6	6	6	5	5	7	5	7	8	6	6	6	7	7	7	9	8	8	8	8	7	8	8	8	8	8

Updated to match(es) played on 15 April 2018. Source: ultimatealeague.com
A = Away; H = Home; W = Win; D = Draw; L = Loss

==== Matches ====
Win Draw Loss Cancelled

8 October 2017 1	Western Sydney Wanderers	2–1	Perth Glory	Sydney
18:00 AEDT	Riera 43'; Kusukami 45+1'	Report	Hamill 82' (o.g.)	Stadium: Spotless Stadium; Attendance: 12,223; Referee: Daniel Elder

15 October 2017 2	Newcastle Jets	2–2	Perth Glory	Newcastle
17:00 AEDT	O'Donovan 30'; Kantarovski 60'	Report	Taggart 8', 90+2'	Stadium: McDonald Jones Stadium; Attendance: 16,663; Referee: Shaun Evans

22 October 2017 3	Perth Glory	2–1	Central Coast Mariners	Perth
16:00 AWST	Keogh 70'; Taggart 85'	Report	Brama 14'	Stadium: nib Stadium; Attendance: 12,167; Referee: Alex King

27 October 2017 4	Sydney FC	2–0	Perth Glory	Sydney
19:50 AEDT	Bobô 45' (pen.); Mierzejewski 90+3' (pen.)	Report		Stadium: Allianz Stadium; Attendance: 10,063; Referee: Shaun Evans

4 November 2017 5	Perth Glory	1–0	Adelaide United	Perth
19:00 AWST	Keogh 80'	Report		Stadium: nib Stadium; Attendance: 11,049; Referee: Stephen Lucas

12 November 2017 6	Wellington Phoenix	5–2	Perth Glory	Wellington
16:30 NZDT	Vidošić 13'; Paracki 34'; Finkler 52'; Kaluđerović 74' (pen.), 87'	Report	Torres 9'; S. Lowry 47'	Stadium: Westpac Stadium; Attendance: 6,105; Referee: Kurt Ams

19 November 2017 7	Perth Glory	0–2	Melbourne Victory	Perth
16:00 AWST		Report	Berisha 56'; George 67'	Stadium: nib Stadium; Attendance: 13,565; Referee: Jonathan Barreiro

24 November 2017 8	Melbourne City	1–3	Perth Glory	Melbourne
19:50 AEDT	McCormack 31'	Report	Nichols 12'; Torres 43' (pen.); Mallia 83'	Stadium: AAMI Park; Attendance: 6,963; Referee: Daniel Elder

3 December 2017 9	Central Coast Mariners	1–0	Perth Glory	Gosford
19:00 AEDT	Powell 78'	Report		Stadium: Central Coast Stadium; Attendance: 8,115; Referee: Kris Griffiths-Jones

9 December 2017 10	Perth Glory	1–2	Newcastle Jets	Perth
19:00 AWST	Knowles 20'	Report	Koutroumbis 88'; Walker 90+2' (o.g.)	Stadium: nib Stadium; Attendance: 8,063; Referee: Adam Kersey

16 December 2017 11	Perth Glory	1–0	Wellington Phoenix	Perth
19:00 AWST	Castro 59'	Report		Stadium: nib Stadium; Attendance: 7,750; Referee: Jarred Gillett

21 December 2017 12	Brisbane Roar	1–2	Perth Glory	Brisbane
18:50 AEST	Maccarone 38'	Report	Keogh 80'; Castro 82'	Stadium: Suncorp Stadium; Attendance: 7,031; Referee: Kurt Ams

30 December 2017 13	Sydney FC	6–0	Perth Glory	Sydney
19:50 AEDT	O'Neill 21'; Mierzejewski 58'; Brosque 62'; Bobô 67' (pen.), 90', 90+5' (pen.)	Report		Stadium: Allianz Stadium; Attendance: 13,332; Referee: Johnathan Barreiro

5 January 2018 14	Perth Glory	0–3	Adelaide United	Perth
19:00 AWST		Report	Adlung 10'; Konstandopoulos 71'; Absalonsen 85'	Stadium: nib Stadium; Attendance: 9,069; Referee: Kurt Ams

9 January 2018 15	Perth Glory	0–2	Melbourne City	Perth
19:00 AWST		Report	McCormack 9', 38' (pen.)	Stadium: nib Stadium; Attendance: 8,016; Referee: Jarred Gillett

13 January 2018 16	Melbourne Victory	3–2	Perth Glory	Melbourne
19:50 AEDT	Troisi 27'; Milligan 47'; Barbarouses 90'	Report	Neville 2'; Castro 83'	Stadium: AAMI Park; Attendance: 14,332; Referee: Shaun Evans

18 January 2018 17	Brisbane Roar	3–2	Perth Glory	Brisbane
18:50 AEST	Papadopoulos 4'; Franjic 60'; Holman 73'	Report	Harold 11', 68'	Stadium: Suncorp Stadium; Attendance: 6,258; Referee: Kris Griffiths-Jones

28 January 2018 18	Perth Glory	3–1	Western Sydney Wanderers	Perth
17:30 AWST	Castro 7' (pen.), 40'; Keogh 43'	Report	Riera 17' (pen.)	Stadium: nib Stadium; Attendance: 9,317; Referee: Jonathan Barreiro

3 February 2018 19	Adelaide United	2–1	Perth Glory	Adelaide
19:20 ACDT	Djulbic 12' (o.g.); Mileusnic 38'	Report	Keogh 5'	Stadium: Coopers Stadium; Attendance: 7,976; Referee: Chris Beath

17 February 2018 20	Wellington Phoenix	2–1	Perth Glory	Wellington
19:35 NZDT	Singh 3'; Lowry 90+2' (o.g.)	Report	Castro 36'	Stadium: Westpac Stadium; Attendance: 4,806; Referee: Alex King

24 February 2018 21	Perth Glory	2–1	Melbourne City	Perth
19:00 AWST	Kilkenny 85'; Taggart 90+7'	Report	Arzani 44'	Stadium: nib Stadium; Attendance: 8,029; Referee: Shaun Evans

4 March 2018 23	Western Sydney Wanderers	1–1	Perth Glory	Sydney
17:00 AEDT	Bridge 10'	Report	Torres 13' (pen.)	Stadium: Spotless Stadium; Attendance: 6,612; Referee: Jarred Gillett

10 March 2018 22	Perth Glory	3–1	Central Coast Mariners	Perth
19:00 AWST	Chianese 29', 61'; Torres 89'	Report	Hoole 71'	Stadium: nib Stadium; Attendance: 7,277; Referee: Kurt Ams

25 March 2018 24	Perth Glory	1–0	Melbourne Victory	Perth
16:00 AWST	Keogh 43'	Report		Stadium: nib Stadium; Attendance: 7,796; Referee: Adam Fielding

29 March 2018 25	Perth Glory	2–3	Sydney FC	Perth
18:30 AWST	Taggart 72', 89'	Report	Mierzejewski 12'; Bobô 29' (pen.), 39'	Stadium: nib Stadium; Attendance: 7,742; Referee: Kris Griffiths-Jones

6 April 2018 26	Newcastle Jets	0–2	Perth Glory	Newcastle
19:50 AEST		Report	Castro 9' (pen.); Taggart 27'	Stadium: McDonald Jones Stadium; Attendance: 8,123; Referee: Chris Beath

14 April 2018 27	Perth Glory	2–3	Brisbane Roar	Perth
22:00 AWST	Taggart 24'; Pepper 86' (o.g.)	Report	Henrique 30', 52'; Kristensen 40'	Stadium: nib Stadium; Attendance: 9,579; Referee: Peter Green

=== FFA Cup ===
1 August 2017 Round of 32	Heidelberg United (Victoria (state))	1–0	(Western Australia) Perth Glory	Melbourne
19:30 AEST	Athiu 48'	Report		Stadium: Olympic Village; Attendance: 2,811; Referee: Adam Kersey

== See also ==
- 2017–18 Perth Glory FC (women) season
