= Shane Lowry (footballer) =

Malaysian footballer (born 1989)

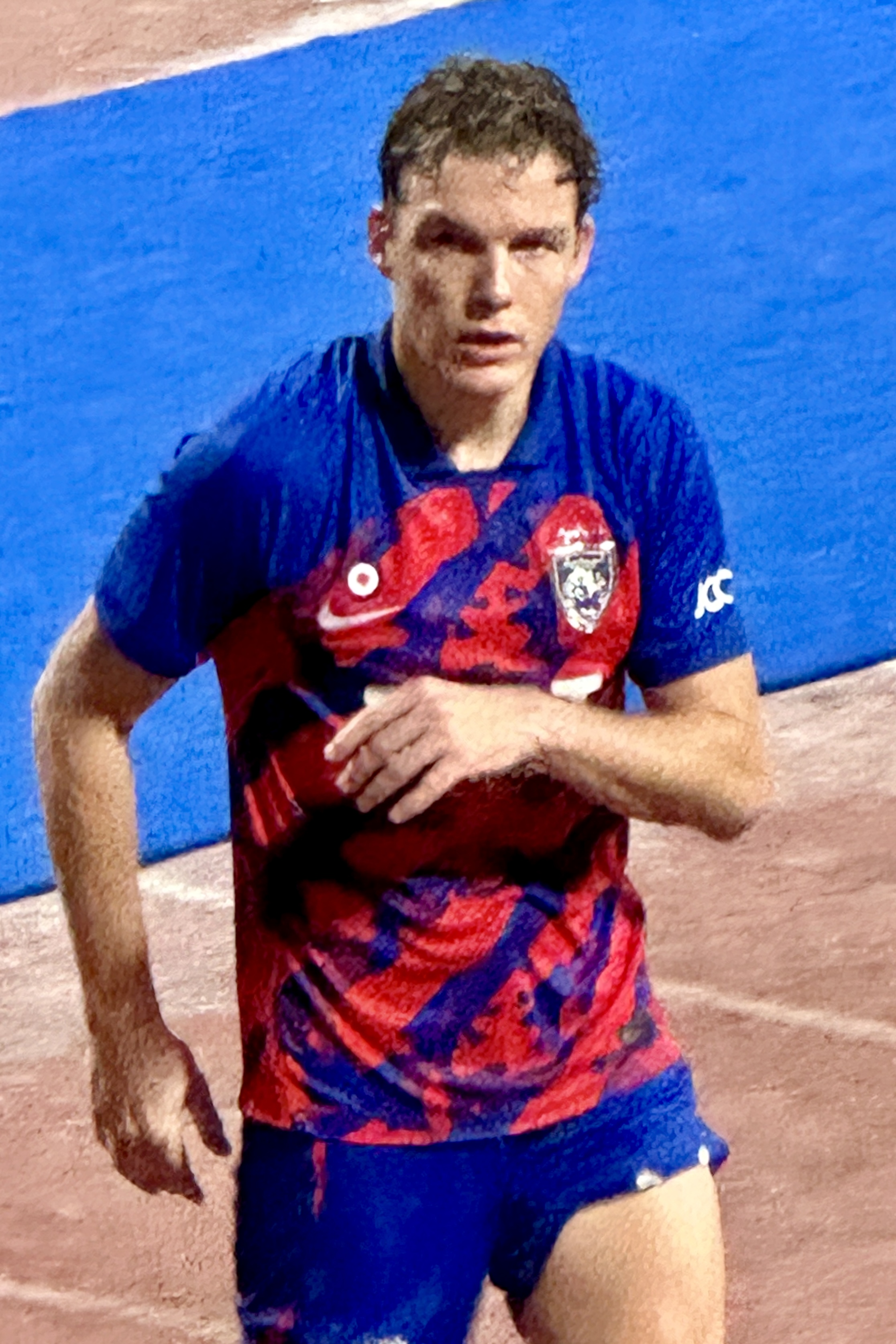
- Lowry with Johor Darul Ta'zim in 2024

Personal information
- Full name: Shane Thomas Lowry
- Date of birth: 12 June 1989 (age 37)
- Place of birth: Perth, Australia
- Height: 1.90 m (6 ft 3 in)
- Position: Centre-back

Team information
- Current team: Johor Darul Ta'zim
- Number: 14

Youth career
- ECU Joondalup
- 2002–2005: Aston Villa

Senior career*
Years	Team	Apps	(Gls)
2005–2012	Aston Villa	65	(2)
2009	→ Plymouth Argyle (loan)	16	(0)
2010	→ Leeds United (loan)	19	(0)
2011	→ Sheffield United (loan)	20	(0)
2011–2012	→ Millwall (loan)	23	(1)
2012–2014	Millwall	64	(7)
2014–2015	Leyton Orient	46	(5)
2015–2016	Birmingham City	10	(0)
2016–2019	Perth Glory	75	(13)
2019–2021	Al Ahli SC	41	(1)
2021–	Johor Darul Ta'zim	69	(2)

International career
2006	Republic of Ireland U17	11	(0)
2008–2009	Republic of Ireland U21	9	(0)
- * Club domestic league appearances and goals as of 26 August 2026

Shane Thomas Lowry (born 12 June 1989) is a professional footballer who plays as a centre-back for Malaysia Super League club Johor Darul Ta'zim. Born in Australia, he has represented Ireland at youth level and committed to play for the Malaysia national team.

His previous clubs include Millwall, Perth Glory, Aston Villa, Plymouth Argyle, Leeds United, Sheffield United, Leyton Orient, Birmingham City and Al Ahli.

== Club career ==
=== Aston Villa ===
Lowry started his youth career with Australian club ECU Joondalup. He signed for Aston Villa in February 2005 along with fellow Australian Chris Herd. Lowry made nine appearances for Aston Villa Reserves in the 2006–07 season, mainly coming near the end of the campaign. Lowry was also part of the squad that won the HKFC International Soccer Sevens in May 2007. In June 2007, Lowry signed a 12-month deal to his contract.

Lowry made his professional debut in the 2009–10 UEFA Europa League in an away fixture at Rapid Vienna. On 17 September 2009, Lowry signed a three-month loan deal with Football League Championship side Plymouth Argyle. Lowry made his Plymouth Argyle debut on 19 September 2009, playing 90 minutes, in a 3–1 loss against Newcastle United. He played 13 league games for Plymouth during his loan spell, where he impressed many and was recalled by Villa who required Lowry's services as cover after some injuries to defenders.

On 28 January 2010, Lowry agreed a deal which would take him on a loan to Leeds United until 13 March 2010, joining his fellow Australian international teammates Patrick Kisnorbo and Neil Kilkenny. He made his debut for Leeds against Colchester United, playing left back for Leeds. After an impressive debut, Lowry suffered a minor injury and had to be substituted and replaced by Bradley Johnson after 70 minutes. After missing the FA Cup replay against Tottenham Hotspur due to not being eligible, Lowry returned to the Leeds starting lineup in the following game against Hartlepool United.

Lowry started for Leeds in the Football League Trophy Northern Area Final, second leg game against Carlisle United, in which the game was lost with Lowry missing the decisive penalty in sudden death in the penalty shootout. After the game it appeared as though Lowry was attacked by a set of Carlisle supporters who had invaded the pitch. After starting every game for Leeds Lowry was dropped from the Leeds squad for the match against Brentford after suffering an injury, before returning to Villa when his loan spell ended. On 25 March 2010 Lowry re-signed for Leeds for a second loan spell, with his loan lasting until the end of the season. Lowry started at left back for Leeds against Norwich City on his return to the club, a match Leeds went on to lose 1–0 in injury time. Lowry didn't overly impress the Leeds fans in his loan spell at Leeds, with him being mostly played out of position at left back for the entire spell, he was substituted for Jonathan Howson in the final game of the season against Bristol Rovers with 1–0 down at the time, but his loan spell ended on a high as Leeds were promoted in 2nd place after scoring two goals to go on and beat Bristol Rovers and secure promotion to The Championship.

After Lowry's loan spell at Leeds was coming to an end, on 11 May he signed a new two-year contract extension at Aston Villa. It was a remarkable few days for Lowry, he was promoted with Leeds, received a call up to Australia's World Cup Squad and on the same day he signed a new two-year deal with Villa. Despite signing a contract with the club, Leeds United was considering re-signing him for the second time ahead of the 2010–11 season, but never happened.

Though he appeared in two matches as an un-used substitute for Aston Villa in the 2010–11 season, Lowry continued to be remain out of the first team and in January 2011, Lowry signed for Championship side Sheffield United until the end of the season making his first start for the Blades away at Coventry City a day later. Lowry made eighteen appearances for the Blades but with the club in decline he was unable to prevent them from being relegated at the end of the season.

=== Millwall ===
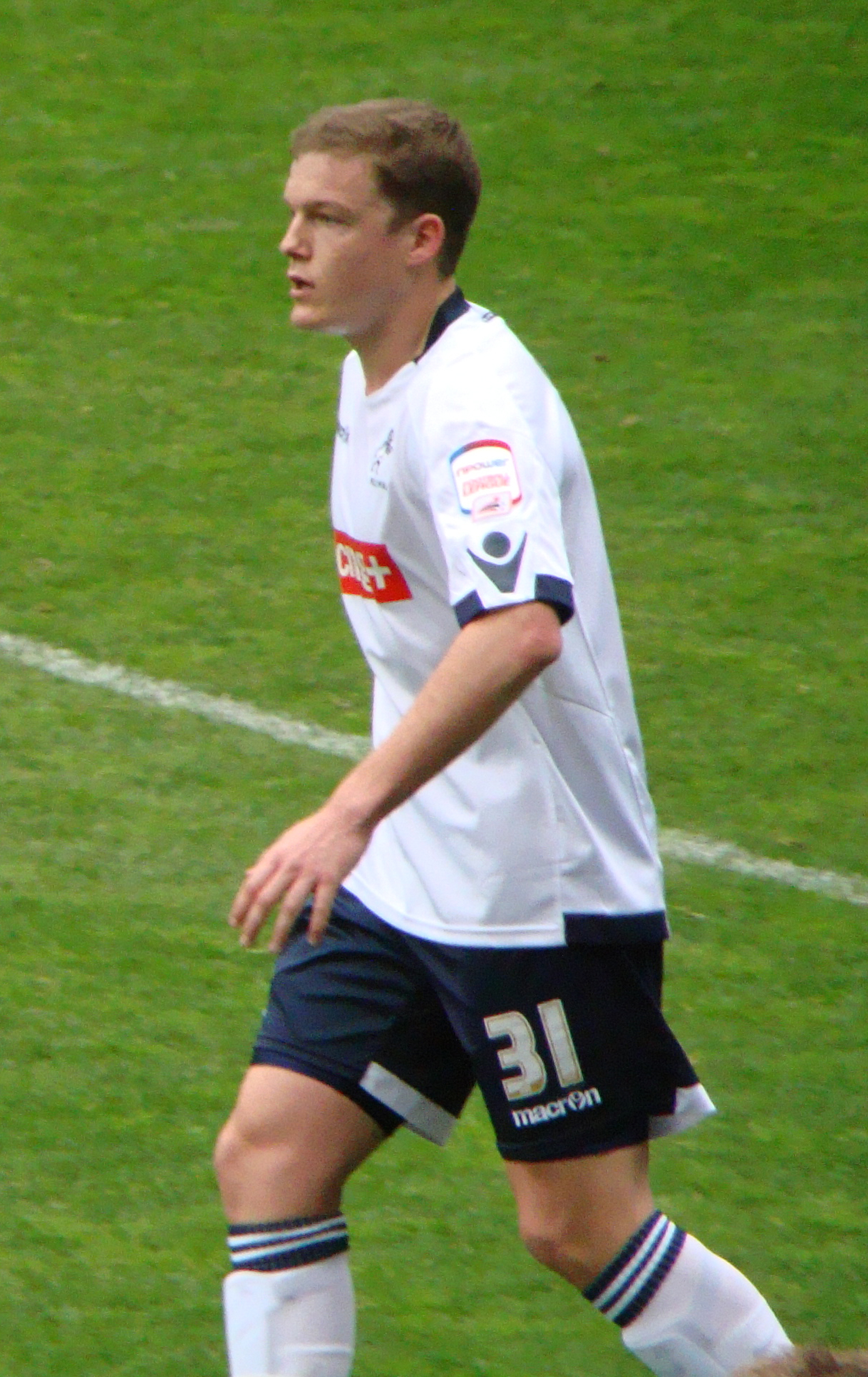
Lowry playing for Millwall in the 2011–12 season

On 23 November 2011, Lowry was again loaned out to play in the Championship, this time to Millwall until 3 January 2012. He followed Aston Villa team-mate Nathan Baker who also signed on loan for Millwall two days earlier. Lowry made his Millwall debut three days later, where he played 90 minutes, in a 0–0 draw against Crystal Palace. His impressive display at Millwall soon earned a loan extension. Weeks later on 13 January 2012, Lowry was sent-off in the 22nd minute after stamping on Nikola Žigić, which saw Millwall lose 6–0. Three years on after signing for Birmingham City, Lowry stated, quoting: "Whatever club I play for I fully commit to that club at the time. I play with my heart on my sleeve. Sometimes in the past I have gone overboard but I was a younger player then, I have learned a lot from these types of experiences. But I am an aggressive player, that's the way I like to play and I can't change the way I play. I will use my experience now and be a bit more clever."'

While serving a suspension, Lowry signed a two-and-a-half-year permanent deal to Millwall for an undisclosed fee on 27 January 2012. Lowry then made his first appearance for the club since joining Millwall permanently, playing 90 minutes, in a 2–1 loss against rivals' West Ham United on 4 February 2012. Right way through March, Lowry was sidelined with ankle injury that kept him out for weeks. After making his first team return against Cardiff City, in a 0–0 draw on 31 March 2012, Lowry scored his first Millwall goal, which he scored the only goal in the game, in a 1–0 win over Coventry City on 17 March 2012. Lowry finished his 2011–12 season, making twenty-two appearances and scoring once.

In the 2012–13 season, Lowry regained his first team place, playing in the left-back and central defense positions until he missed one game after picking up a yellow card for the fifth time against Bristol City on 2 October 2012. After making his first team return as a left-back, Lowry then provided assist for the winning goal when he set up a goal for Chris Woods, in a 1–0 win against his former club, Leeds United on 18 November 2012. Lowry was then banned for two matches between 19 January 2013 and 25 January 2013 after picking up a yellow card for the tenth time this season. Lowry then "curled a superb, dipping free-kick" to score from 35 yards (32 m) as Millwall beat Charlton Athletic 2–0 at The Valley on 16 March 2013. Lowry played in all matches in the run up to the Lions' FA Cup semi final against Wigan Athletic at Wembley, though he missed one match in the 4th round against his former club, Aston Villa. In late-April, Lowry was given a three match ban after being booked for the fifteenth time this season. Despite this, Lowry finished the 2012–13 season, making forty-five appearances and scoring once in all competitions.

In the 2013–14 season, Lowry suffered a minor thigh strain in the club's pre-season friendly. Despite this, Lowry remained in the first team under the new management of Steve Lomas until he received a straight red card after a foul on Will Hughes, in a 5–1 loss against Derby County on 14 September 2013. After serving a three match ban, Lowry remained on the bench without playing for four matches Lowry made his first team return on 2 November 2013 when he came on as a substitute for Scott Malone against Burnley. However, his return, after spending two months without playing, was a disastrous when he scored an own goal, which saw Millwall draw 2–2. After this, Lowry was out of the first team, demoted to the substitute bench between mid-November and mid-December until he made his return on 26 December 2013, in a 4–0 loss against Watford. On 28 January 2014, Lowry was sent-off for the second time this season in the late-minutes against Sheffield Wednesday after fighting with Giles Coke, who also was sent-off as well, with both side drew 1–1. After serving a four match ban, Lowry was in the first team throughout February and March until he suffered a foot injury that kept him out for the remainder of the season. Lowry went on to finish the 2013–14 season, making twenty-two appearances.

Millwall confirmed that Lowry would leave the club when his contract expired at the end of the 2013–14 season. After leaving the club, Lowry was linked with clubs around Championship, League One and even overseas.

=== Leyton Orient ===
On 23 July 2014, Lowry signed for Football League One side Leyton Orient on a two-year contract. Upon joining the club, Lowry was given a number twelve shirt ahead of the 2014–15 season.

Lowry made his Leyton Orient debut, playing as a left-back position, in the opening game of the season, which saw Leyton Orient lost 2–1 to Chesterfield. Since his debut, Lowry established himself in the left-back position in the first half of the season despite being sidelined with suspension and fitness concern that saw him out for two matches. Following his return to the first team, Lowry played in the central-defense between December and March until he dropped from the first team throughout March. Lowry went on to make his first team return throughout 2014–15 season, making thirty-four appearances in his first season at Leyton Orient.

After Orient's relegation at the end of the season, Lowry expressed a desire to leave the club, and went on trial with Birmingham City before exercising a release clause in his Orient contract, leaving Brisbane Road on 28 August 2015.

=== Birmingham City ===
On 9 September 2015, Lowry signed a deal with Championship club Birmingham City until the end of the 2015–16 season. Upon joining Birmingham City, Lowry stated he aiming to work his way through the first team under the management of Gary Rowett.

The form and fitness of centre-backs Michael Morrison and Jonathan Spector and left-back Jonathan Grounds restricted Lowry to a seat on the bench until mid-December. He eventually made his debut in the starting eleven for the home fixture against Cardiff City on 18 December, standing in for the injured Grounds at left back. He appeared once more, in the FA Cup, before his contract was cancelled by mutual consent to enable him to return to Australia.

=== Perth Glory ===
On 27 January 2016, Lowry returned to Australia after a decade away from Australia when he signed a two-and-a-half-year deal with A-League side Perth Glory. Upon joining Perth Glory, Lowry said of the move, quoting: "I've got a lot of experience behind me now and I want to use it to guide the young lads who are in this young squad. I've spent 11 years in England and it's shaped my football over there and I'm really happy to be here and get stuck into the games"

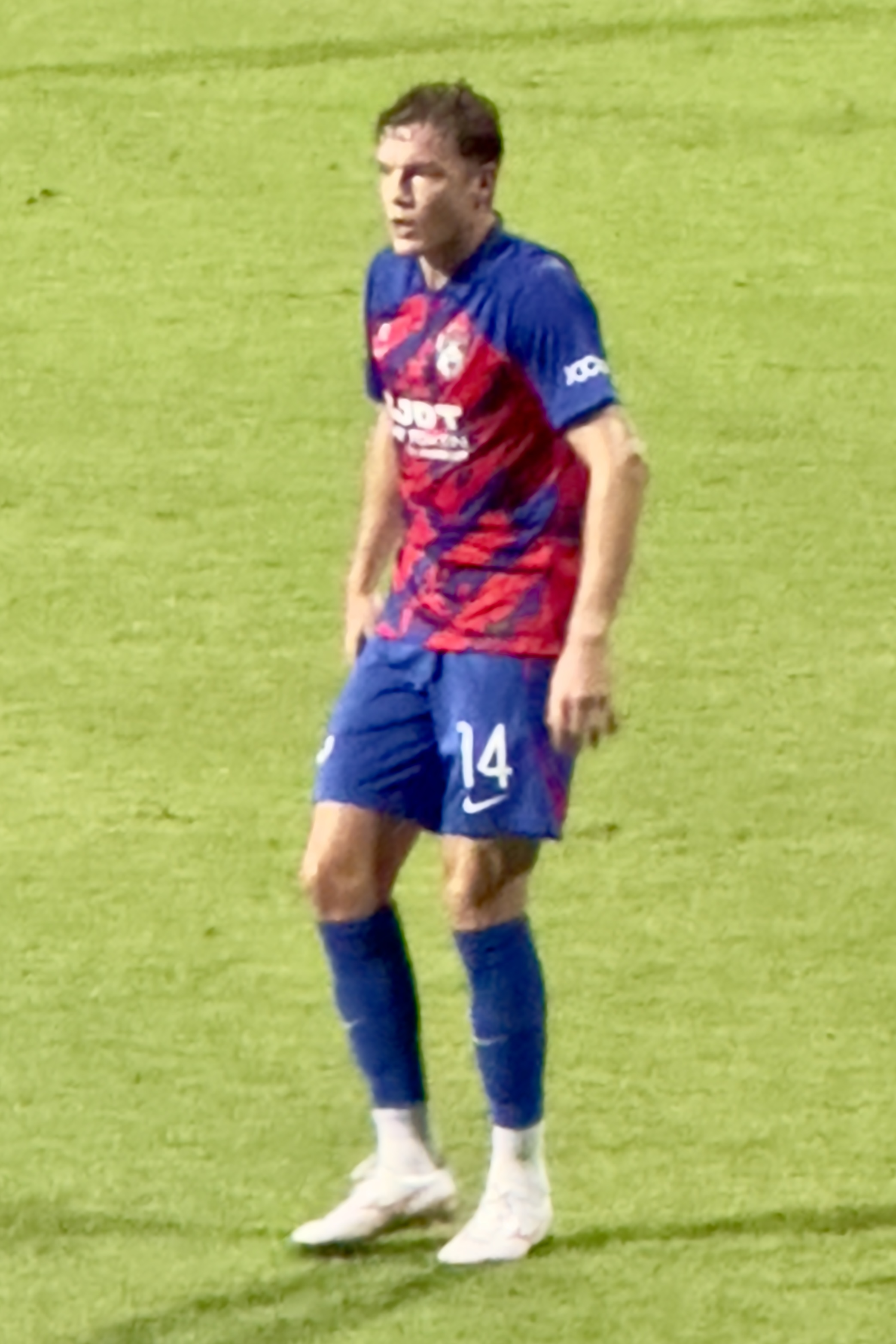
Lowry playing for Johor Darul Ta'zim in 2024

Lowry made his debut for the Glory on 30 January 2016, starting against Melbourne Victory. Lowry then scored his first Perth Glory goal on 20 February 2016 when he scored a header in the 41st minute, to give Brisbane Roar a thrashing with a 6–3 win. Throughout the 2015–16 season, Lowry established himself in the starting eleven and formed a central defense partnership with Alex Grant, as he made ten appearances for Perth Glory in his first half of the season.

On 14 April 2019, Lowry won his first silverware, helping Perth Glory to the Premier's Plate. It was Glory's first trophy after a 15-years drought.

=== Al Ahli ===
On 8 August 2019, Lowry signed for Doha-based club Al Ahli in the Qatar Stars League for an undisclosed fee. He make his debut for the club on 23 August 2019 playing the entire 90th minute against Al Arabi. On 20 February 2020, Lowry scored his first goal for the club in a league match against Al Gharafa which resulsted in a 1–1 draw

=== Johor Darul Ta'zim ===
On 20 May 2021, Lowry signed for Malaysia Super League club Johor Darul Ta'zim on a free transfer. On 4 September 2021, he scored his first goal for the club in a 1–0 league win against Terengganu.

== International career ==
Lowry was born in Australia to Irish parents, and began his international career with the Republic of Ireland under-17 team. He represented that country up to under-23 level before, in September 2009, opting to make himself available to the Australia national team for his senior career.

=== Australia ===
Lowry received his first call-up to the full Australia squad for a friendly match against the Netherlands in Sydney and the 2011 AFC Asian Cup qualifier against Oman in Melbourne in October. He did not play in either match. On 11 May 2010, Lowry was selected as part of Pim Verbeek's 30-man provisional squad for the 2010 FIFA World Cup, and travelled to South Africa, but was not included in the final 23-man FIFA World Cup squad. Lowry was named in Han Berger's 18-man squad for an August 2010 friendly against Slovenia, but he did not appear in the match.

Though he played no games or received call-ups since 2011, Lowry said he made the right decision to switch. After five years since the last time he received a call-up, Lowry hinted he could a receive a call-up following his move to Perth Glory.

=== Malaysia ===
On 21 August 2026, Lowry announce official acquire Malaysian citizenship after completing five years of continuous residency in Malaysia. On 12 November 2026, his request to switch his international allegiance to Malaysia was approved by FIFA.

== Personal life ==
Lowry has a partner, who is based in Birmingham and young child. Upon joining Perth Glory, Lowry moved the family to Australia. Lowry's younger brother, Ryan, is currently contracted to Olympic Kingsway SC which play in the National Premier Leagues Western Australia.

== Club statistics ==
As of 9 August 2024

Appearances and goals by club, season and competition
Club	Season	League			National cup (Note: Includes FA Cup, Australia Cup, Qatari Stars Cup, Malaysia FA Cup)		League cup (Note: Includes EFL Cup, Malaysia Cup)		Other		Total	
Club	Season	Division	Apps	Goals	Apps	Goals	Apps	Goals	Apps	Goals	Apps	Goals
Aston Villa	2009–10	Premier League	0	0	1	0	0	0	2 (Note: Appearances in UEFA Europa League)	0	3	0
Aston Villa	2010–11	Premier League	0	0	0	0	0	0	0	0	0	0
Aston Villa	2011–12	Premier League	0	0	0	0	0	0	0	0	0	0
Aston Villa	Total		0	0	1	0	0	0	2	0	3	0
Plymouth Argyle (loan)	2009–10	Championship	13	0	—		—		—		13	0
Leeds United (loan)	2009–10	League One	11	0	—		—		1 (Note: Appearance in Football League Trophy)	0	12	0
Sheffield United (loan)	2010–11	Championship	17	0	—		—		—		17	0
Millwall (loan)	2011–12	Championship	9	0	0	0	0	0	—		9	0
Millwall	2011–12	Championship	13	1	1	0	0	0	—		14	1
Millwall	2012–13	Championship	39	1	5	0	1	0	—		45	1
Millwall	2013–14	Championship	22	0	1	0	0	0	—		23	0
Millwall	Total		83	2	7	0	1	0	—		91	2
Leyton Orient	2014–15	League One	34	0	1	0	1	0	4	0	40	0
Birmingham City	2015–16	Championship	1	0	1	0	0	0	—		2	0
Perth Glory	2015–16	A-League	12	1	0	0	—		0	0	12	1
Perth Glory	2016–17	A-League	13	0	1	0	—		0	0	14	0
Perth Glory	2017–18	A-League	20	1	1	0	—		0	0	21	1
Perth Glory	2018–19	A-League	26	2	0	0	—		0	0	26	2
Perth Glory	Total		71	4	2	0	0	0	0	0	73	4
Al Ahli	2019–20	Qatar Stars League	21	1	3	0	—		0	0	24	1
Al Ahli	2020–21	Qatar Stars League	20	0	4	0	—		1 (Note: Appearances in Emir of Qatar Cup)	0	25	0
Al Ahli	Total		41	1	7	0	0	0	1	0	49	1
Johor Darul Ta'zim	2021	Malaysia Super League	7	1	0	0	0	0	5 (Note: Appearances in AFC Champions League)	0	12	1
Johor Darul Ta'zim	2022	Malaysia Super League	16	0	3	0	0	0	6	0	25	0
Johor Darul Ta'zim	2023	Malaysia Super League	8	0	1	0	2	0	4	0	15	0
Johor Darul Ta'zim	2024–25	Malaysia Super League	1	0	2	0	0	0	5	0	8	0
Johor Darul Ta'zim	Total		32	1	6	0	2	0	15	0	55	1
Career total			302	8	24	0	4	0	27	0	358	8

== Honours ==
=== Club ===
Leeds United

- Football League One runners-up: 2009–10

Perth Glory

- A-League: Premier's Plate winner 2018–19

Johor Darul Ta'zim

- Malaysia Super League: 2021, 2022, 2023, 2024–25
- Malaysia FA Cup: 2022, 2023, 2024
- Malaysia Cup: 2022, 2023, 2024–25
- Malaysia Charity Shield: 2022, 2023, 2024, 2025
