= Joel Chianese =

Australian soccer player

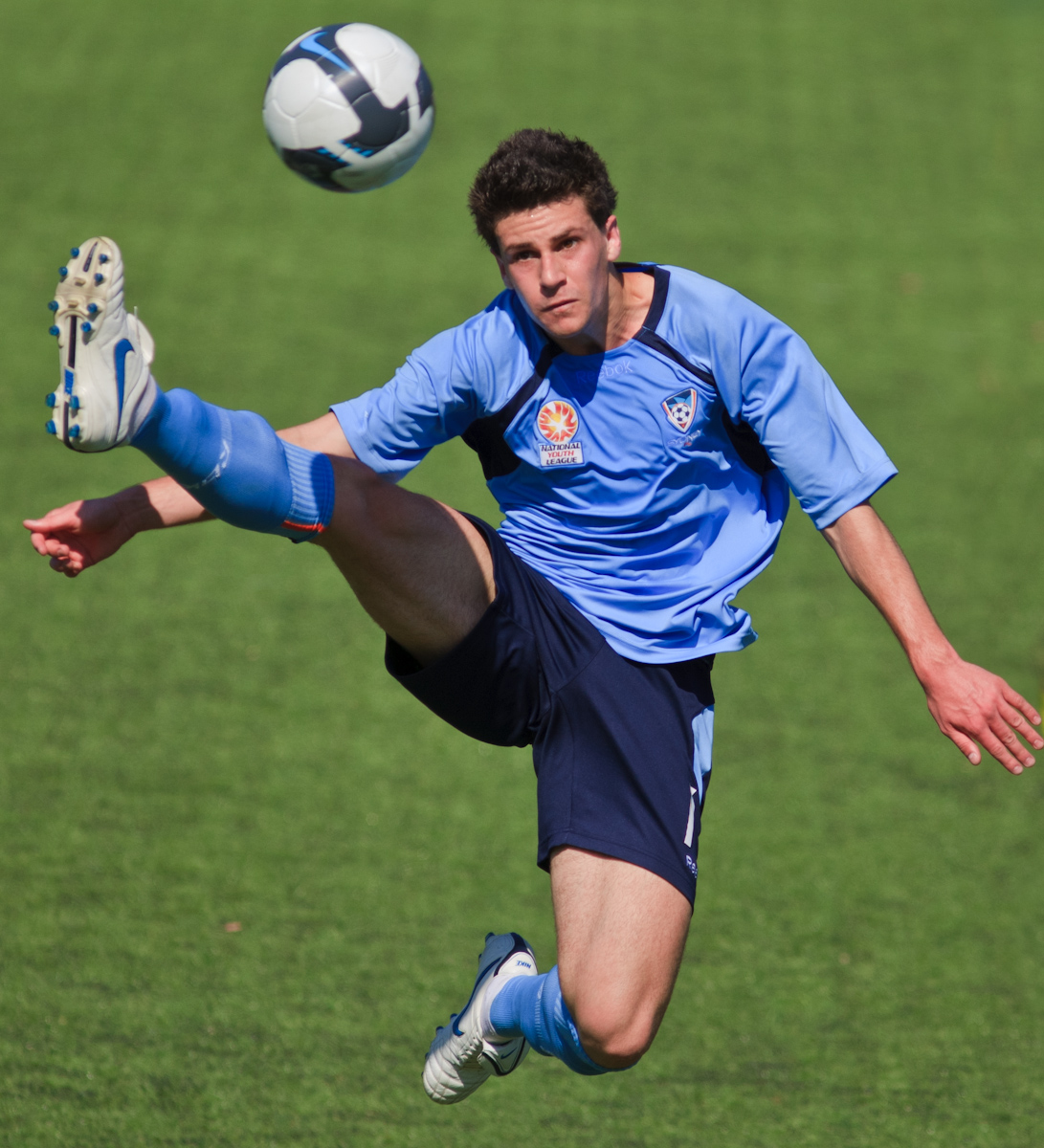
- Chianese playing for Sydney FC Youth in 2009

Personal information
- Full name: Joel Joseph Chianese
- Date of birth: 15 February 1990 (age 36)
- Place of birth: Sydney, Australia
- Height: 1.80 m (5 ft 11 in)
- Positions: Attacking midfielder; forward

Youth career
- Blacktown City
- 2008–2011: Sydney FC

Senior career*
Years	Team	Apps	(Gls)
2009–2010	Blacktown City	19	(6)
2011–2014	Sydney FC	40	(11)
2014–2015	Sydney United	8	(2)
2015	Bonnyrigg White Eagles	1	(2)
2015	Auckland City	0	(0)
2015	Sabah FA	14	(7)
2016	Negeri Sembilan	15	(10)
2016–2020	Perth Glory	87	(14)
2020–2023	Hyderabad	51	(9)
2021	→ Perth Glory (loan)	12	(4)
2024–	Perth RedStar		
- * Club domestic league appearances and goals as of 16:30, 29 December 2022 (UTC)

Joel Joseph Chianese (born 15 February 1990) is an Australian soccer player currently playing for Perth RedStar in the NPL WA competition.

== Career ==
=== Sydney FC ===
Chianese made his senior debut in the first game of the 2011 Asian Champions League as a substitute for Hirofumi Moriyasu in the 0–3 loss against Kashima Antlers at the Sydney Football Stadium.

His A-League debut for the club didn't arrive until Round 19 of the 2011–12 A-League season, coming on as a substitute in the 5–2 thrashing at the hands of Newcastle Jets at the Sydney Football Stadium. Chianese scored twice in the first final of the 2011/12 season against the Wellington Phoenix FC, however it was not enough as Sydney lost 3–2.

=== National Premier Leagues ===
Following his release from Sydney FC, Chianese signed with National Premier Leagues NSW club Sydney United, and undertook a 2-week trial in England with Football League One club Swindon Town. This trial proved unsuccessful despite scoring twice in a friendly against Cheltenham Town, and he returned to Australia.

Chianese left Sydney United at the conclusion of the 2014 National Premier Leagues NSW season and signed with crosstown rivals Bonnyrigg White Eagles for 2015, for whom he scored a brace on debut.

=== Malaysia ===
In March 2015 it was reported that Chianese had traveled to New Zealand to play for Auckland City FC in the 2014–15 OFC Champions League, however Auckland failed to register him in time for the competition. However, in a bizarre twist of fate, Auckland City then sold him on to Malaysia Premier League club Sabah FA for the remainder of the 2015 Malaysia Premier League after they had released Singaporean Fazrul Nawaz for disciplinary reasons.

In December 2015 it was announced that Chianese had decided to join Negeri Sembilan FA, linking up with former National Soccer League winning coach Gary Phillips, and a host of former A-League players for the 2016 Malaysia Premier League season

Despite scoring 10 goals in 15 league appearances, Chianese was released from his contract mid-season with Negeri Sembilan FA along with fellow Australian Andrew Nabbout.

=== Perth Glory ===
At the end of August 2016, Chianese returned to the A-League, joining Perth Glory.

=== Hyderabad ===
At the end of August 2020, Chianese joined Indian Super League club Hyderabad FC. At the group stage campaign of 2023 Indian Super Cup on 9 April, against Aizawl, he scored a goal as they won by 2–1.

==== Loan to Perth Glory ====
On 12 April 2021, Chianese returned to the A-League once again, agreeing a short-term deal with former club Perth Glory until the end of the 2020–21 season, while also signing a year extension with Hyderabad FC.

=== Perth RedStar ===
Perth RedStar announced the signing of Chianese in February 2024.

== Career statistics ==
As of 3 May 2023

Club	Season	League			Cup		Continental		Total	
Club	Season	Division	Apps	Goals	Apps	Goals	Apps	Goals	Apps	Goals
Sydney	2011–12	A-League	9	6	0	0	1	0	10	6
Sydney	2012–13	A-League	13	1	0	0	0	0	13	1
Sydney	2013–14	A-League	18	4	0	0	0	0	18	4
Perth Glory	2016–17	A-League	23	2	0	0	0	0	23	2
Perth Glory	2017–18	A-League	12	2	1	0	0	0	13	2
Perth Glory	2018–19	A-League	28	5	0	0	0	0	28	5
Perth Glory	2019–20	A-League	24	5	1	0	1	0	26	5
Hyderabad	2020–21	Indian Super League	12	3	0	0	—		12	3
Hyderabad	2021–22	Indian Super League	19	4	0	0	—		19	4
Hyderabad	2022–23	Indian Super League	20	2	6 (Note: Appearance(s) in Durand Cup) (Note: Appearance(s) in Super Cup)	2	1 (Note: Appearance(s) in Qualifier for AFC Cup qualifying play-off)	1	27	5
Hyderabad	Hyderabad total		51	9	6	2	1	1	58	12
Perth Glory (loan)	2020–21	A-League	12	4	0	0	0	0	12	4
Career total			190	38	8	2	3	1	201	41

== Honours ==
Perth Glory

- A-League Premiership: 2018–19

Hyderabad

- Indian Super League: 2021–22
