= Scott Neville =

Australian soccer player (born 1989)

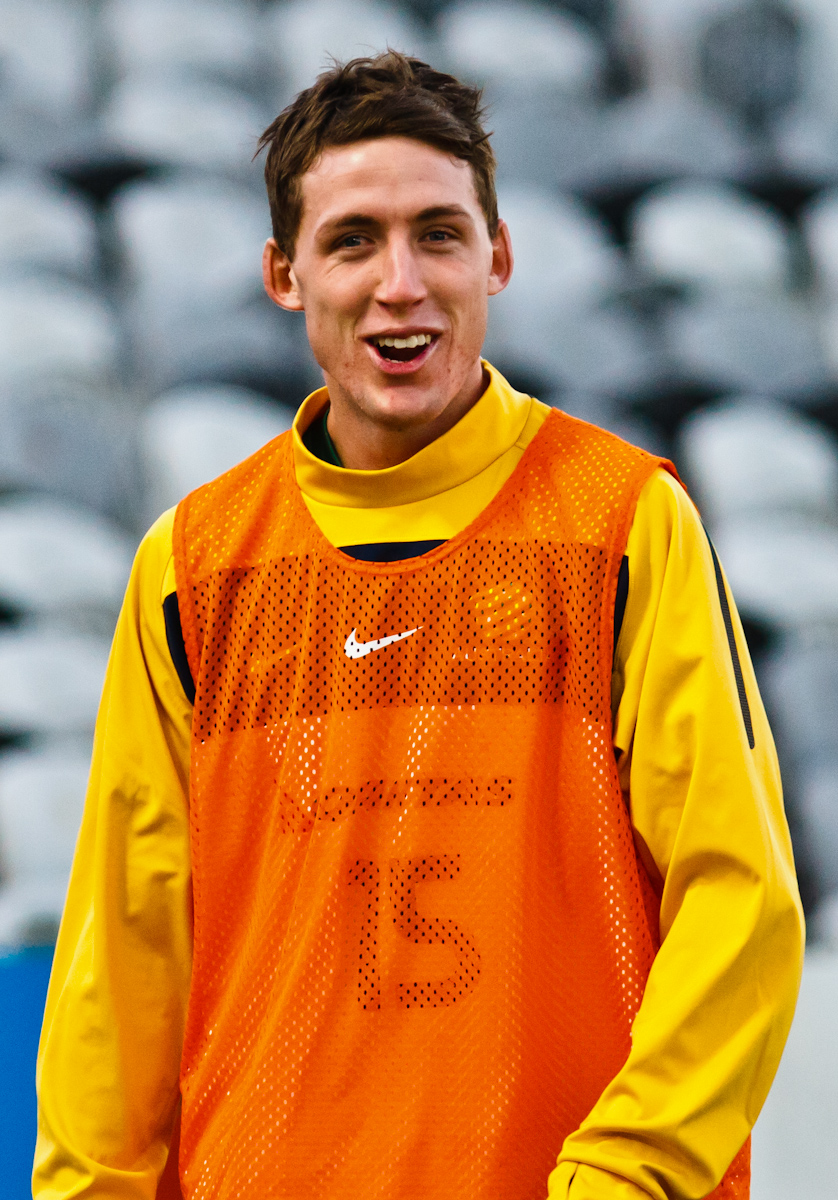
- Neville warming up for the Olyroos in 2011

Personal information
- Date of birth: 11 January 1989 (age 37)
- Place of birth: Devon, England
- Height: 1.84 m (6 ft 0 in)
- Position: Right back

Youth career
- 2005–2006: WA NTC
- 2008–2011: Perth Glory

Senior career*
Years	Team	Apps	(Gls)
2006–2008	Sorrento	46	(11)
2008–2012	Perth Glory	63	(4)
2012–2015	Newcastle Jets	43	(3)
2015–2017	Western Sydney Wanderers	51	(1)
2017–2019	Perth Glory	48	(3)
2019–2025	Brisbane Roar	101	(4)
2020–2021	→ East Bengal (loan)	16	(1)

International career^{‡}
2010	Australia U23	5	(0)
- * Club domestic league appearances and goals as of 31 January 2025 ‡ National team caps and goals as of 19 November 2010

Scott Neville (born 11 January 1989) is a retired professional soccer player who played as a defender. Born in England, he represented Australia at youth level.

== Personal life ==
Scott Neville is the son of former English Football League pro, Steve Neville. Steve Neville was playing for Exeter City at the time when Scott was born. Scott married his partner of five years, Sarah McGeechan, in a lavish marquee wedding in Nedlands, Perth on 24 May 2019.

== Career ==
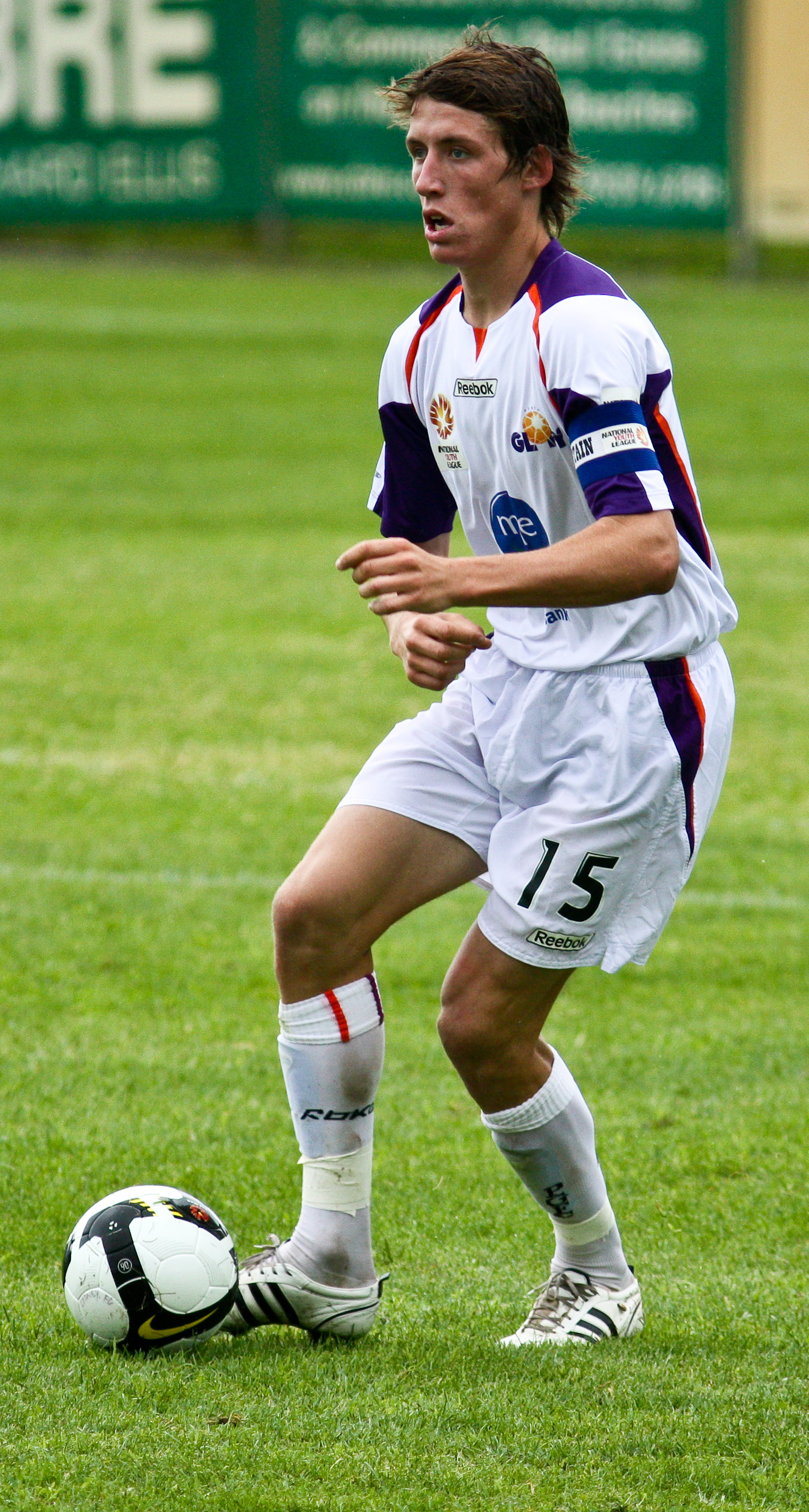
Neville playing for the Perth Glory youth team

He made his senior debut for Perth Glory as a substitute on 31 December 2008 against Central Coast Mariners.

He then made a starting debut against Melbourne Victory the next week and was named man of the match by coach Dave Mitchell.

On 31 March 2011 it was announced that Scott Neville had been handed a two-week trial by Championship club Portsmouth. On 2 April 2010, Neville had an unsuccessful trial with Portsmouth. Immediately after he took part in a trial at Sheffield Wednesday.

On 7 May 2012 it was announced he had signed a two-year contract with A-League club Newcastle Jets.

On 25 April 2017, Neville confirmed his departure from Western Sydney Wanderers, and subsequently joined Perth Glory. In his last season for the club, the team finished first in the A-League and were crowned premiers of the league.

On 26 June 2019, Neville departed Perth Glory. A few days later he signed with Brisbane Roar. Later that year on 30 November, Neville scored his first goal for Roar in a 2–0 home victory.

In October 2020, Neville was loaned to SC East Bengal until the end of the 2020–21 Indian Super League season.

On 31 January 2025, Brisbane Roar announced Neville's retirement after playing 300 A-League games.

== Career statistics ==
=== Club ===
As of 25 April 2022

Club	Season	League		Finals		Cup		AFC		Total	
Club	Season	Apps	Goals	Apps	Goals	App	Goals	Apps	Goals	Apps	Goals
Perth Glory	2008–09	4	0	–	–	0	0	–		4	0
Perth Glory	2009–10	24	1	1	1	–	–	–		25	2
Perth Glory	2010–11	26	2	–	–	–	–	–		26	2
Perth Glory	2011–12	5	0	3	0	–	–	–		8	0
Perth Glory	Total	59	3	4	1	0	0	0	0	63	4
Newcastle Jets	2012–13	18	0	–	–	–	–	–		18	0
Newcastle Jets	2013–14	9	1	–	–	–	–	–		9	1
Newcastle Jets	2014–15	16	2	–	–	0	0	–		16	2
Newcastle Jets	Total	43	3	0	0	0	0	0	0	43	3
Western Sydney Wanderers	2015–16	26	0	2	1	1	0	–		29	1
Western Sydney Wanderers	2016–17	22	0	1	0	–	–	4 (Note: Appearances in the AFC Champions League)	0	31	0
Western Sydney Wanderers	Total	48	0	3	1	1	0	4	0	56	1
Perth Glory	2017–18	19	0	–	–	–	–	–		19	0
Perth Glory	2018–19	20	0	2	1	1	0	–		23	1
Perth Glory	Total	39	0	2	1	1	0	0	0	42	1
Brisbane Roar	2019–20	24	2	1	0	2	0	–		28	2
East Bengal (loan)	2020–21	16	1	–		–		–		16	1
Brisbane Roar	2020–21	14	0	1	0	0	0	–		15	0
Brisbane Roar	2021–22	23	1	0	0	3	0	–		26	1
Career total		266	10	11	3	7	0	4	0	288	13

== Honours ==
Perth Glory

- A-League Premiership: 2018–19

Individual

- A-Leagues All Star: 2022
