= Andy Keogh =

Irish footballer (born 1986)

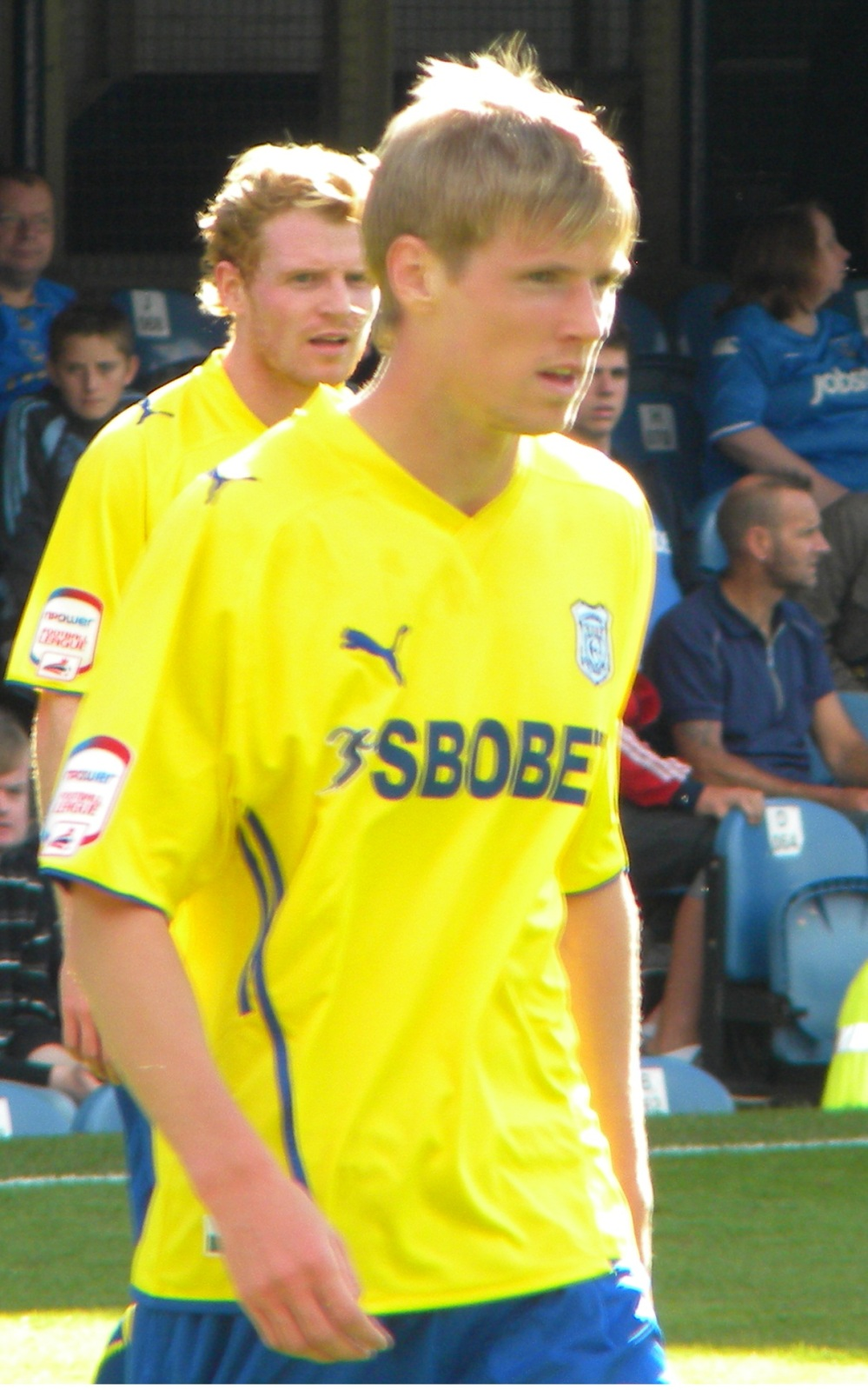
- Keogh playing for Cardiff City in 2010

Personal information
- Full name: Andrew Declan Keogh
- Date of birth: 16 May 1986 (age 40)
- Place of birth: Dublin, Republic of Ireland
- Height: 6 ft 0 in (1.83 m)
- Position: Forward

Team information
- Current team: East Perth FC

Youth career
- Cabinteely
- St Josephs Boys
- Leeds United

Senior career*
Years	Team	Apps	(Gls)
2003–2005	Leeds United	0	(0)
2004	→ Scunthorpe United (loan)	12	(2)
2005	→ Bury (loan)	4	(2)
2005–2007	Scunthorpe United	86	(19)
2007–2012	Wolverhampton Wanderers	116	(19)
2010–2011	→ Cardiff City (loan)	16	(2)
2011	→ Bristol City (loan)	9	(1)
2011–2012	→ Leeds United (loan)	22	(2)
2012–2014	Millwall	70	(17)
2014	→ Blackpool (loan)	14	(3)
2014–2015	Perth Glory	27	(12)
2015	Ratchaburi Mitr Phol	8	(0)
2016–2019	Perth Glory	96	(43)
2019	Al-Qadsiah	17	(8)
2020	NorthEast United	7	(1)
2020–2022	Perth Glory	34	(4)
2023	North Beach SC	2	(2)
2024	Dianella White Eagles		
2025–	East Perth FC		

International career^{‡}
2006	Republic of Ireland B	2	(1)
2006–2008	Republic of Ireland U21	4	(5)
2007–2012	Republic of Ireland	30	(2)

Managerial career
- 2016–2017: Inglewood United (assistant)
- 2017–2018: Inglewood United
- 2017–2018: Perth Glory (head of recruitment)
- * Club domestic league appearances and goals as of 10 May 2022 ‡ National team caps and goals as of 14 August 2013

Andrew Declan Keogh (born 16 May 1986) is an Irish professional footballer who plays as a forward for semi-professional side East Perth FC. Born in Dublin, Keogh played the first several years of his professional career playing for a number of clubs in England, including Wolverhampton Wanderers, for whom he made over 100 appearances. In 2014, Keogh moved to Australia to play for Perth Glory. He left the Glory for one year to play in the Thai Premier League for Ratchaburi before returning in early 2016, and again in 2020, after leaving in 2019, for Al-Qadsiah.

Keogh has won thirty caps for the Republic of Ireland national team, scoring two goals.

== Club career ==
=== Early career ===
Born in south Dublin to Declan and Linda, he attended CBC Monkstown along with his younger brother, Kenny. Although a talented Rugby player, he chose football in his mid teens. Keogh began his playing career at Cabinteely FC and Joeys FC in South Dublin. He also was an accomplished midfielder in gaelic football at juvenile level with Cabinteely GAA.

=== Leeds United ===
Keogh moved to Leeds United at the age of sixteen. He failed to break into their first team and was loaned out to the League Two side Scunthorpe United at the beginning of the 2004–05 season.

Here, he made his league debut on 7 August 2004, in a 3–1 win over Rochdale. He scored two goals in 12 appearances before an injury crisis at Elland Road caused him to be recalled to his parent club. After failing to get into the team under manager Kevin Blackwell, he made his one appearance as a late substitute in a League Cup tie against Portsmouth, he then spent the rest of 2004 playing reserve games for Leeds, until he was loaned to Bury in January 2005 as a replacement for Preston North End-bound David Nugent.

=== Scunthorpe United ===
While on loan at Bury, Scunthorpe United manager Brian Laws made an offer to Leeds (said to be around £50,000) to bring him to the club on a permanent basis. Leeds accepted the offer, and on 14 February, Keogh rejoined the club he had started the season with. He only scored only one further goal, but was part of the team which won promotion to League One as runners-up behind Yeovil Town.

He truly made his mark in the 2005–06 season, after Scunthorpe signed fellow 19-year-old striker Billy Sharp for £100,000 from Sheffield United. Keogh became part of the most potent strike-force in League One, scoring 38 goals between them, with Keogh netting 15 of them. He also scored Scunthorpe's goal in the FA Cup third Round visit to Manchester City, beating the then England international goalkeeper, David James in the process to open the scoring.

On 12 January 2007, it was announced that he had rejected an improved contract offer from Scunthorpe United and would therefore be free to leave the club at the end of the 2006–07 season. As he was under the age of 24, Scunthorpe were able to command a fee for him, either as a direct offer or via a tribunal. Keogh's goals helped earn Scunthorpe promotion to the Championship as champions, the number of points achieved (91) and the number of goals scored by his strike partner Billy Sharp (30) were greater than those achieved by any other team in the Premiership and the Football League that season.

=== Wolverhampton Wanderers ===
Having had an earlier bid of £500,000 turned down, Keogh signed for Championship side Wolverhampton Wanderers on 23 January 2007. He signed a three-and-a-half-year contract with the transfer set to cost Wolves an initial £600,000 potentially rising to £850,000 with add-ons.

Keogh earned plaudits for his displays for Wolves, with Queens Park Rangers manager John Gregory describing him as "one of the signings of the season." He scored five goals for the club before the end of the season which helped them to reach the play-offs, where they lost in the semi-finals to local rivals West Bromwich Albion.

At the start of the next season, he was recognised for his efforts for Wolves, and was given their number 9 shirt. He went on to score 11 goals (eight in the league) during a campaign which saw the club miss out on the play-offs on goal difference.

The 2008–09 season, Keogh's first team opportunities were limited with Chris Iwelumo and Sylvan Ebanks-Blake topping the championship top scorers list in a campaign that saw Wolves promoted to the Premier League as champions. However, Keogh still played in 42 of the 46 League games during the promotion season, and scored against Derby County on Easter Monday.

Injuries at the start of Wolves' Premier League campaign gave Keogh his opportunity to return to the starting line-up. He became Wolves' first goalscorer of the season, scoring the only goal in a 1–0 win at Wigan Athletic. It was Wolves' first ever Premier League away win, and first top flight away win since 1984. However, he later fell out of the team after injuries to others healed.

In December 2009, he suffered a tendon and ligament injury to his ankle that needed surgery and put him out of contention for three months. After recovering he made only a few fleeting substitute appearances in the club's push toward Premier League survival; a total of 13 league appearances and one goal for the campaign.

==== Loan spells ====
Having fallen behind Kevin Doyle and new signing Stephen Fletcher in the pecking order at Wolves, Keogh joined Championship side Cardiff City in what was due to be a season-long loan deal to replace Ross McCormack who was set to leave the club to join Leeds. He made his debut in a 2–0 win against Portsmouth, the first of 17 appearances for the Bluebirds, during which he scored twice (coincidentally, both were last minute goals).

However, he was not a regular starter as the club chased promotion (ultimately without success). He fell behind strikers Jay Bothroyd and Michael Chopra and wingers Craig Bellamy and Chris Burke in the pecking order. His loan was terminated on 31 January 2011.

He immediately moved to Championship side Bristol City on a 93-day loan deal. He only scored once for Bristol City – in a 4–0 victory over Preston North End – before he picked up a back injury that cut his stay short after nine appearances. This injury ended his season and he returned to Wolves.

He featured in Wolves' opening day victory over Stoke, in what was ultimately his final appearance for the club, before rejoining Leeds United on loan in August until the New Year with the view to a permanent move. Keogh revealed he felt he had "unfinished business" at Leeds after only playing one game in his previous spell at the club. Keogh made his league and second debut for Leeds on 16 August, when he started against Hull City in a 4–1 win. After playing games up front with Ross McCormack, Keogh was moved to left wing for the first time when Luciano Becchio returned from injury against Manchester United.

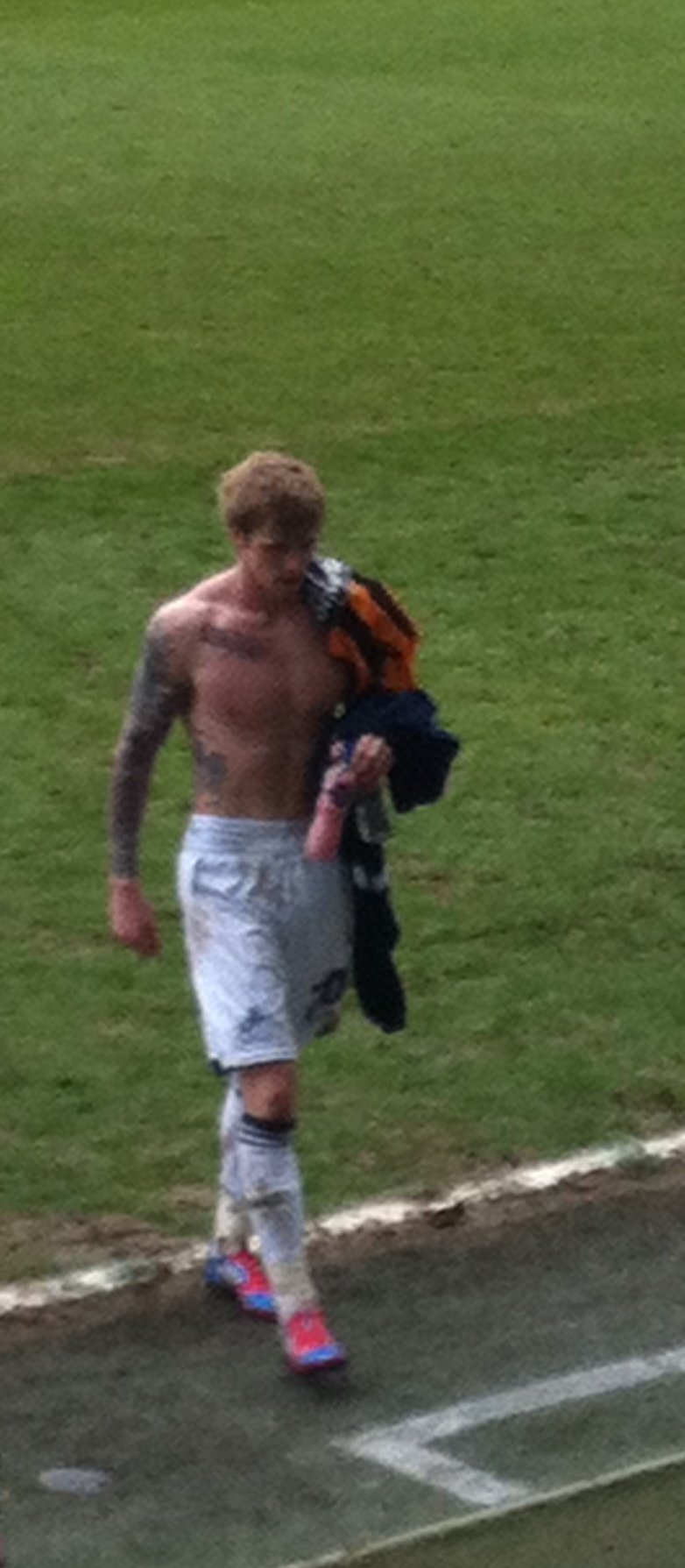
Keogh with Millwall in 2012

The forward scored his first goal for Leeds in a 3–3 draw against Brighton & Hove Albion on 23 September. He netted once more, during the 22 appearances of his loan stay. Although the player was hopeful that a permanent deal could be agreed, it failed to be so and he returned to Wolves at the conclusion of his loan on 3 January.

=== Millwall ===
On the final day of the January 2012 transfer window, Keogh joined Championship club Millwall in a two-and-a-half-year deal for an undisclosed fee thought to be around £500,000.

=== Blackpool ===
On 31 January 2014, Keogh joined Blackpool on loan until the end of the 2013–14 season. He was released by Millwall on 10 May 2014.

=== Perth Glory ===
On 30 May 2014, Keogh signed with Australian club Perth Glory in the A-League.

On 5 August 2014, Keogh played his first official game for Perth, scoring both goals in a 2–0 win over Newcastle Jets FC, leading the team to the last 16 of the FFA Cup.

On 12 October, Keogh made his first appearance for Perth Glory in the A-League. He scored the first goal in a 2–1 away win against Wellington Phoenix.

On 19 October, Keogh scored all three goals in a 3–2 victory over defending premiers & champions Brisbane Roar, Keogh was awarded his hat-trick after it was officially ruled that Perth Glory's second goal was not an own goal against James Donachie.

After departing Perth due to the club's salary cap breach in 2015, Keogh briefly joined Thai Premier League side Ratchaburi.

On 11 December 2015, it was announced that he had re-signed with Perth Glory. Due to Glory's visa spots being full and the FFA denying the club's request to register Keogh as a guest player, Keogh seemed most likely to be available to the club only in 2016. On 7 January 2016, Perth Glory agreed to a mutual termination of Guyon Fernandez contract, freeing up a visa spot for Keogh.

Keogh scored a hat-trick for Perth in a 3–2 win over Melbourne City on 21 October 2016.

Keogh was a key player in the 2018–19 season premiership win after scoring 15 goals for the club. Despite wishing to stay with the club in 2019, he was unwanted in the squad and his contract was terminated. He joined Saudi Arabian club Al-Qadsiah in July 2019.

=== NorthEast United FC ===
In January 2020, Andy Keogh was officially signed by Indian Super League club NorthEast United FC. He made his debut for the club against Chennaiyin FC, where his team lost 2–0. He scored his first goal for the club in his 5th match against Hyderabad FC, where his team lost 5–1.

=== Return to Perth Glory ===
In October 2020, it was revealed that Keogh would return to Perth, reuniting with former teammate Richard Garcia who is now the head coach.

In November 2020, Keogh gained Australian citizenship.

== International career ==
Keogh received his first call-up to the Republic of Ireland squad from Steve Staunton in March 2007, after Caleb Folan was forced to withdraw through injury. He went on to make his debut for the senior team on 23 May 2007, in a friendly against Ecuador in Giants Stadium, New York, and later featured in their Euro 2008 qualifying campaign.

He scored the equaliser in Giovanni Trapattoni's first match in charge, a 1–1 draw with Serbia in a friendly match at Croke Park, Dublin, a goal that won the FAI Goal of the Year Award. Keogh had also scored the first goal of the Trapattoni era in a training camp game against a Portuguese football league team. With Robbie Keane and Kevin Doyle the preferred partnership up front, he has found himself on the bench mostly making substitute appearances. He scored his second goal for Ireland on 12 October 2012, scoring a late consolation goal in a 6–1 defeat at home to Germany.

== Managerial career ==
In April 2017, Keogh was named as head coach of Perth-based club Inglewood United, whilst still playing for Perth Glory, after holding a previous assistant coach role at Inglewood. On 31 August 2018, Inglewood announced that Keogh had stepped down as head coach.

After retiring from his playing career at Perth Glory, Keogh became the club's head of recruitment in 2022 following the appointment of head coach Ruben Zadkovich as full time. He left his role at Perth Glory in early August 2023.

== Career statistics ==
=== Club ===
Appearances and goals by club, season and competition
Club	Season	League			National cup		League cup		Other		Total	
Club	Season	Division	Apps	Goals	Apps	Goals	Apps	Goals	Apps	Goals	Apps	Goals
Leeds United	2004–05	Championship	0	0	0	0	1	0	—		1	0
Bury	2004–05	League Two	4	2	0	0	0	0	0	0	4	2
Scunthorpe United	2004–05	League Two	25	3	0	0	0	0	0	0	25	3
Scunthorpe United	2005–06	League One	45	11	4	3	1	0	2 (Note: Appearances in Football League Trophy)	1	52	15
Scunthorpe United	2006–07	League One	28	7	3	0	1	0	0	0	32	7
Scunthorpe United	Total		98	21	7	3	2	0	2	1	109	25
Wolverhampton Wanderers	2006–07	Championship	17	5	0	0	0	0	2 (Note: Appearances in Championship play-offs)	0	19	5
Wolverhampton Wanderers	2007–08	Championship	43	8	3	2	2	1	—		48	11
Wolverhampton Wanderers	2008–09	Championship	42	5	2	1	2	0	—		46	6
Wolverhampton Wanderers	2009–10	Premier League	13	1	0	0	2	0	—		15	1
Wolverhampton Wanderers	2010–11	Premier League	1	0	0	0	0	0	—		1	0
Wolverhampton Wanderers	2011–12	Premier League	0	0	0	0	0	0	—		0	0
Wolverhampton Wanderers	Total		116	19	5	3	6	1	2	0	129	23
Cardiff City	2010–11	Championship	16	2	2	0	0	0	0	0	18	2
Bristol City	2010–11	Championship	9	1	0	0	0	0	—		9	1
Leeds United	2011–12	Championship	22	2	0	0	2	0	—		24	2
Millwall	2011–12	Championship	18	10	1	0	0	0	—		19	10
Millwall	2012–13	Championship	37	6	5	0	0	0	—		42	6
Millwall	2013–14	Championship	15	1	0	0	2	1	—		17	2
Millwall	Total		70	17	6	0	2	1	0	0	78	18
Blackpool	2013–14	Championship	14	3	0	0	0	0	—		14	3
Perth Glory	2014–15	A-League	27	12	5	5	—		—		32	17
Ratchaburi	2015	Thai Premier League	8	0	0	0	0	0	—		8	0
Perth Glory	2015–16	A-League	15	10	0	0	—		—		15	10
Perth Glory	2016–17	A-League	28	12	2	0	—		—		30	12
Perth Glory	2017–18	A-League	24	6	1	0	—		—		25	6
Perth Glory	2018–19	A-League	28	15	0	0	—		—		28	15
Perth Glory	Total		96	43	3	0	0	0	0	0	99	43
NorthEast United	2019–20	Indian Super League	7	1	—		—		—		7	1
Perth Glory	2020–21	A-League	23	4	0	0	—		—		23	4
Perth Glory	2021–22	A-League	11	0	0	0	—		—		11	0
Perth Glory	Total		34	4	0	0	0	0	0	0	34	4
Career total			488	127	26	11	13	2	4	1	563	141

=== International ===
Scores and results list Republic of Ireland's goal tally first, score column indicates score after each Keogh goal.

List of international goals scored by Andy Keogh
No.	Date	Venue	Opponent	Score	Result	Competition
1	24 May 2008	Croke Park, Dublin, Ireland	Serbia	1–1	1–1	Friendly
2	12 October 2012	Aviva Stadium, Dublin, Ireland	Germany	1–6	1–6	2014 FIFA World Cup qualification

== Honours ==
Scunthorpe United

- Football League One: 2006–07

Wolverhampton Wanderers

- Football League Championship: 2008–09

Perth Glory

- A-League Premiers: 2018–19

Republic of Ireland

- Nations Cup: 2011

Individual

- A-League Goal of the Year: 2020–21
