= Jason Davidson =

Australian footballer (born 1991)

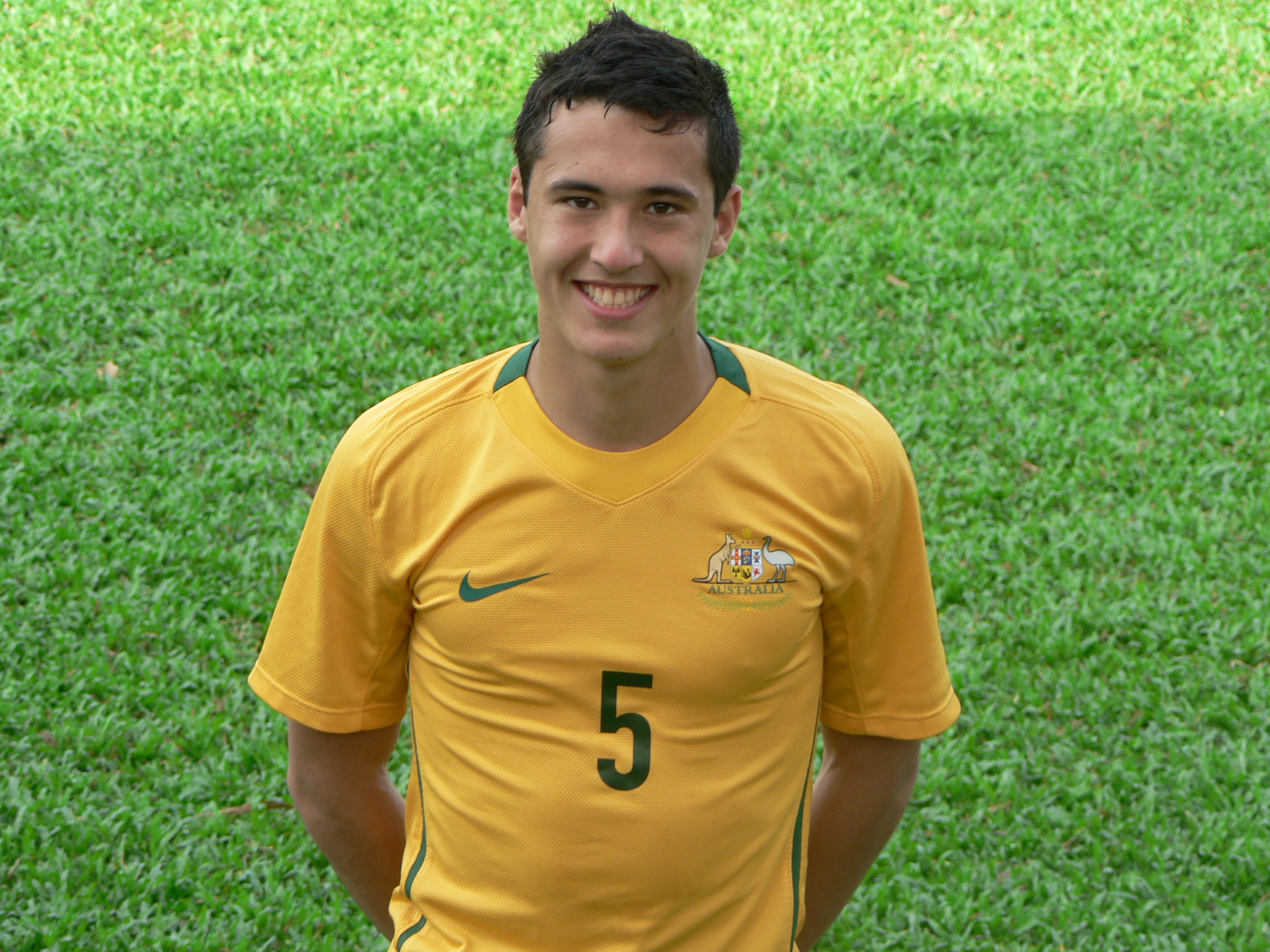
- Davidson with Australia U20 in 2009

Personal information
- Full name: Jason Alan Davidson
- Date of birth: 29 June 1991 (age 35)
- Place of birth: Melbourne, Victoria, Australia
- Height: 1.81 m (5 ft 11 in)
- Position: Left-back

Team information
- Current team: Melbourne Victory
- Number: 3

Youth career
- 2005–2008: Seiritsu Gakuen
- 2009: Paços de Ferreira

Senior career*
Years	Team	Apps	(Gls)
2009	Hume City	16	(2)
2009–2011	Paços de Ferreira	5	(0)
2010–2011	→ Sporting Covilhã (loan)	14	(0)
2011–2014	Heracles Almelo	46	(2)
2014–2015	West Bromwich Albion	2	(0)
2015–2017	Huddersfield Town	27	(1)
2016–2017	→ Groningen (loan)	22	(0)
2017–2018	Rijeka	0	(0)
2018	→ Olimpija Ljubljana (loan)	13	(1)
2018–2019	Perth Glory	26	(2)
2019–2021	Ulsan Hyundai	7	(0)
2021–2022	Melbourne Victory	25	(1)
2022–2024	Eupen	62	(1)
2024–2025	Panserraikos	28	(1)
2025–	Melbourne Victory	24	(1)

International career^{‡}
2009–2011	Australia U20	6	(0)
2012–2022	Australia	23	(1)
Medal record
Representing Australia
Men's Association football
AFC Asian Cup
Winner	2015 Australia
AFC U-20 Asian Cup
Runner-up	2010 China
- * Club domestic league appearances and goals as of 28 March 2026 ‡ National team caps and goals as of 28 August 2022

Jason Alan Davidson (born 29 June 1991) is an Australian professional soccer player who plays as a left-back for Australian club Melbourne Victory.

== Club career ==
=== Hume City ===
On 26 January 2009, Davidson signed with Victorian Premier League club Hume City, becoming the youngest starting member in the VPL at the age of 17. After having spent three years in the Japanese football development system. He garnered attention from several A-League clubs after being called up the Australian U-20 squad on 17 March 2009. In June 2009 he left Hume City to pursue several overseas trials.

=== Paços de Ferreira ===
In September 2009 Davidson signed with Portuguese club, Paços de Ferreira before being voted 2009 Victorian Premier League – Under 21 Player of the Year. Among serious interest from clubs such as European heavyweights VfB Stuttgart and Sporting CP, along with Turkish club Ankaragucu, Davidson also immediately received contract offers from A-League club, Newcastle Jets and another Turkey Super League club in Diyarbakirspor before signing for Paços.

On 16 January 2010, Davidson made his senior debut for Paços de Ferreira in the Primeira Liga, coming on as a substitute against Porto being the youngest player registered in the league at 18 in 2009–10 season.

Davidson suffered an ankle injury upon return from the 2010 AFC U-19 Championship and on 3 February 2011, was subsequently loaned to Liga de Honra outfit Sporting Covilhã for the remainder of the 2010–11 season for much needed game time after the long injury lay-off.

=== Heracles Almelo ===
Davidson joined Heracles Almelo in January 2012. He had an excellent senior debut starting for Heracles Almelo in the Eredivisie on 25 March 2012 at the Polman Stadium against FC Utrecht. He played centre-back and Heracles Almelo won 3–1 at home.

=== West Bromwich Albion ===
Davidson moved to West Bromwich Albion on 5 August 2014, after an impressive 2014 FIFA World Cup campaign. On 23 August 2014, Davidson made his debut in the Premier League for West Bromwich Albion, after being subbed on for Sébastien Pocognoli in the 60th minute against Southampton and the game finished in a nil all draw.

=== Huddersfield Town ===
Davidson signed a three-year contract with Huddersfield Town on 26 June 2015. He made his début for the Terriers in a 2–0 defeat against Hull City at the KC Stadium on 8 August 2015. His first goal for the club came in their 5–0 win over Charlton Athletic on 12 January 2016.

=== Groningen ===
On 18 August 2016, Davidson was loaned out to Eredivisie side FC Groningen on a season-long deal. Davidson had an outstanding performance on his debut, 21 August 2016 against FC Twente in a thrilling game.

=== Rijeka ===
After being released by Huddersfield Town with a year left on his contract, on 28 August 2017, Davidson joined Croatian club Rijeka on a three-year deal. He made his début for Rijeka in a 3–1 away win against Vrbovec in Round 1 of the Croatian Football Cup on 20 September 2017.

=== Perth Glory ===
On 13 July 2018, it was announced that Davidson would join A-League club Perth Glory on a one-year deal. In his first season for the club, the team finished first in the A-League and were crowned premiers of league.

=== Ulsan Hyundai ===
On 19 June 2019, it was announced that Davidson would join K League 1 club Ulsan Hyundai on a two-year contract.

=== Melbourne Victory ===
Melbourne Victory announced that they had signed Davidson for the 2021–22 A-League season on 16 July 2021.

== International career ==
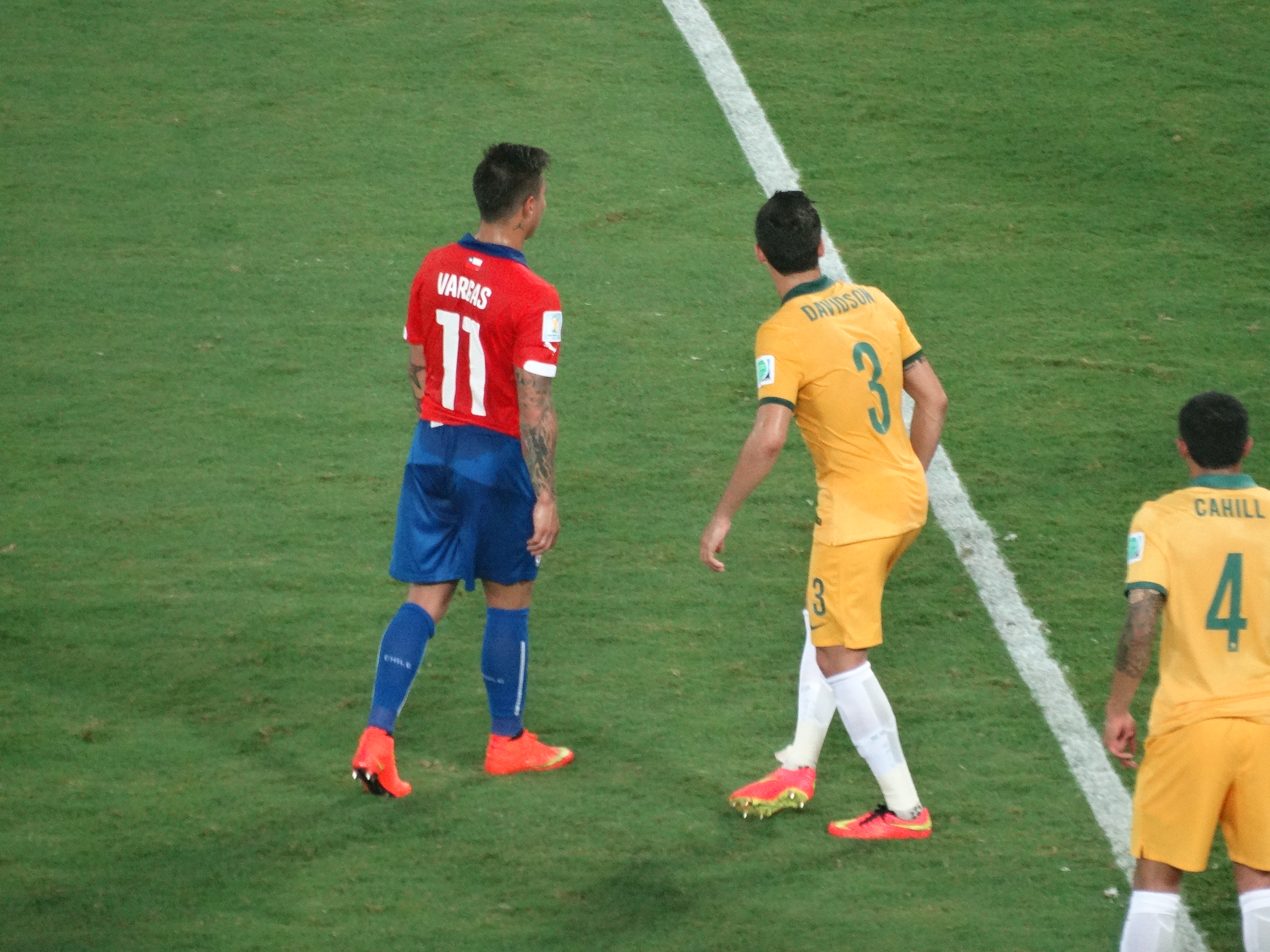
Davidson playing against Eduardo Vargas at the 2014 FIFA World Cup.

Davidson was called up to Australia U-20 squad on 17 March 2009 to compete in the Under 20 World Cup held in Egypt in September 2009. He was also called into Australia's initial 50-man squad prior to the 2011 Asian Cup, he was cut however from the final squad.

Davidson made his first full international debut on 15 August 2012 against Scotland in Edinburgh, coming on as a substitution just after half time and scoring an own goal after trying to clear a header. He played in all of Australia's group matches against Chile, Holland and Spain at the 2014 FIFA World Cup in Brazil. Davidson was named as part of Australia's 2015 AFC Asian Cup squad, which went on to win the trophy. He scored his first international goal in the semi-final against the United Arab Emirates. He was Australia's first choice to play left-back in that squad.

== Personal life ==
Davidson is the son of international footballer Alan Davidson and has a quarter Japanese ancestry through his paternal grandmother. Additionally, his mother Effie descends from Greek immigrants.

== Career statistics ==
=== Club ===
As of 7 April 2024

Appearances and goals by club, season and competition
Club	Season	League			Cup		Continental		Other		Total	
Club	Season	Division	Apps	Goals	Apps	Goals	Apps	Goals	Apps	Goals	Apps	Goals
Hume City	2009	Victorian Premier League	16	2	0	0	—		—		16	2
Paços de Ferreira	2009–10	Primeira Liga	5	0	0	0	—		—		5	0
Sporting Covilhã	2010–11	Liga de Honra	14	0	0	0	—		—		14	0
Heracles Almelo	2011–12	Eredivisie	6	0	0	0	—		—		6	0
Heracles Almelo	2012–13	Eredivisie	10	0	2	0	—		—		12	0
Heracles Almelo	2013–14	Eredivisie	30	2	3	0	—		—		33	2
Heracles Almelo	Total		46	2	5	0	0	0	0	0	51	2
West Bromwich Albion	2014–15	Premier League	2	0	3	0	—		—		5	0
Huddersfield Town	2015–16	Championship	27	1	3	0	—		—		30	1
FC Groningen	2016–17	Eredivisie	22	0	0	0	—		—		22	0
Rijeka	2017–18	Croatian First Football League	0	0	1	0	—		—		1	0
Olimpija Ljubljana	2017–18	Slovenian PrvaLiga	13	1	1	0	—		—		14	1
Perth Glory	2018–19	A-League	28	2	0	0	—		—		28	2
Ulsan Hyundai	2019	K League 1	3	0	0	0	—		—		3	0
Ulsan Hyundai	2020	K League 1	4	0	0	0	3	0	1	0	8	0
Ulsan Hyundai	Total		7	0	0	0	3	0	1	0	11	0
Melbourne Victory	2021–22	A-League	25	1	2	1	1	0	—		28	2
Eupen	2022–23	Belgian Pro League	33	0	0	0	—		—		33	0
Eupen	2023–24	Belgian Pro League	28	1	1	0	—		1	0	30	1
Eupen	Total		61	1	1	0	0	0	1	0	63	1
Career total			266	10	16	1	4	0	2	0	288	11

=== International ===
Scores and results list Australia's goal tally first.

#	Date	Venue	Opponent	Score	Result	Competition
1	27 January 2015	Newcastle International Sports Centre, Newcastle, Australia	United Arab Emirates	2–0	2–0	2015 AFC Asian Cup

== Honours ==
'Olimpija Ljubljana

- Slovenian PrvaLiga: 2017–18
- Slovenian Cup: 2017–18

Perth Glory

- A-League: Premiers 2018–19

Ulsan Hyundai

- AFC Champions League: 2020

Melbourne Victory

- FFA Cup: 2021

Australia

- AFC Asian Cup: 2015

Australia U-20

- AFC U-20 Asian Cup: runner-up 2010

Individual

- A-Leagues All Star: 2022
- PFA A-League Team of the Season: 2018–19, 2021–22
