= Zayd Farah =

Somali footballer

Personal information
- Full name: Zayd Muse Farah
- Date of birth: 12 January 2000 (age 26)
- Place of birth: Australia
- Position: Defender

Team information
- Current team: Perth Soccer Club

Youth career
- Perth Glory

Senior career*
Years	Team	Apps	(Gls)
2018–2022	Perth Glory NPL	46	(0)
2021–2022	→ Bayswater City (loan)	30	(0)
2022–2023	Bayswater City		

International career^{‡}
2021–	Somalia	2	(0)
- * Club domestic league appearances and goals as of 27 August 2024 ‡ National team caps and goals as of 18:00, 28 June 2021 (UTC)

Zayd Muse Farah (Somali: Zayd Muuse Faarax; born 12 January 2000) is a professional footballer who plays as a defender for Bayswater City, on loan from Perth Glory. Born in Australia, he represents the Somalia national team.

== Club career ==
Farah made his debut for Perth Glory Youth, making 22 appearances during the 2018 Football West season. During his time at Perth Glory, Farah also played for Bayswater City.

== International career ==
On 15 June 2021, Farah made his debut for Somalia, in a 1–0 friendly loss against Djibouti.
