= Neil Kilkenny =

Australia international footballer (born 1985)

Personal information
- Full name: Neil Martin Kilkenny
- Date of birth: 19 December 1985 (age 40)
- Place of birth: Enfield, England
- Height: 5 ft 8 in (1.73 m)
- Position: Central midfielder

Youth career
- 2002–2004: Arsenal

Senior career*
| Years | Team | Apps | (Gls) |
| 2004–2008 | Birmingham City | 26 | (0) |
| 2004–2005 | → Oldham Athletic (loan) | 27 | (4) |
| 2007–2008 | → Oldham Athletic (loan) | 20 | (1) |
| 2008 | → Leeds United (loan) | 1 | (0) |
| 2008–2011 | Leeds United | 122 | (8) |
| 2011–2014 | Bristol City | 68 | (1) |
| 2013–2014 | → Preston North End (loan) | 7 | (0) |
| 2014–2016 | Preston North End | 68 | (3) |
| 2016–2018 | Melbourne City | 28 | (2) |
| 2018–2021 | Perth Glory | 84 | (11) |
| 2021–2023 | Western United | 47 | (1) |
| 2024–2025 | Sorrento | 14 | (0) |

International career
| 2003 | England U-18 | 2 | (0) |
| 2003 | Republic of Ireland U-19 | 1 | (0) |
| 2004–2005 | England U-20 | 3 | (0) |
| 2007–2008 | Australia U-23 | 10 | (0) |
| 2006–2012 | Australia | 15 | (0) |
Medal record
Representing Australia
Men's Association football
AFC Asian Cup
| Runner-up | 2011 Qatar |
- * Club domestic league appearances and goals as of 10 January 2024

Neil Martin Kilkenny (born 19 December 1985) is a former professional footballer. A midfielder, he began his career in the youth system at Arsenal, and went on to play league football for Oldham Athletic, Birmingham City, Leeds United, Bristol City, Preston North End, Melbourne City, Perth Glory, Western United, and Sorrento.

Kilkenny was born in England, has Irish grandparents, and was raised in Australia. He played youth international football for both England and Ireland before committing to Australia. He has 15 caps for Australia, and competed for the country at the 2008 Olympics.

== Early life and career ==
Born in Enfield, London, Kilkenny moved to Australia with his family at the age of four, and grew up in Brisbane. A promising schoolboy footballer, he captained the Queensland schools' representative team. When Kilkenny was eleven, the family returned to England to maximise his chances of making a career in the game. At twelve, he was invited to join Arsenal's youth development scheme, and while a student at Ravenscroft School, Barnet, he played for Middlesex Schools and appeared for Arsenal's under-17 team. In July 2002 he began a two-year scholarship programme in Arsenal's Academy.

By the 2003–04 season, he had graduated to Arsenal's under-19 team and once been an unused substitute for the reserves, and had played international football for Republic of Ireland under-19s, qualifying via grandparents from Sligo, and for England under-18s. However, he became unhappy at Arsenal, chose to leave the club, and after trials with clubs including Aston Villa, Manchester City and Leicester City, he joined Birmingham City on a free transfer in January 2004.

== Club career ==
=== Birmingham City and loans ===
Kilkenny signed a two-and-a-half-year contract with Birmingham. The club's academy director felt he had "the ability to play at the highest level", and prioritised adding a "work ethic and competitiveness" to his "great technique". The player travelled with the first team for the game at Charlton Athletic in April 2004, but was not included in the matchday squad. Perceived as not ready for the first team at Premier League level, he was loaned to League One club Oldham Athletic in November 2004 to gain first-team experience. He made his debut in the Football League as a second-half substitute in Oldham's 3–2 win at home to Barnsley on 20 November, and scored two goals in his second game, a 3–1 win away to Bradford City, four days later. He played a full part in Oldham's season: he took the free kick which led to the winning goal against Premier League Manchester City in the FA Cup, and ended up as winner of the club's Players' Young Player of the Season award.

At the start of the 2005–06 season he became part of the Birmingham first-team squad, though manager Steve Bruce warned him that he would not easily find his way into the team. On 20 September 2005, he made his Birmingham first-team debut in the League Cup away at Scunthorpe United, as a 26th-minute substitute to replace the injured Muzzy Izzet. Four days later, with six other midfielders unavailable through injury or suspension, he made his full home debut against Liverpool in the Premier League, in which he was sent off late in the game for handling the ball on the goal-line, thus giving Liverpool a penalty and a 2–2 draw. Despite his dismissal, he received words of encouragement from teammates Mikael Forssell and Mario Melchiot for his performance, and went on to make 25 appearances in all competitions, mainly as substitute, as Birmingham were relegated to the Championship. The following season Kilkenny's appearances were infrequent; he started only two games, both in the League Cup. The player became frustrated; while part of the first-team squad, he was rarely part of the first team, yet Bruce was reluctant to allow him out on loan.

It was announced on 30 July 2007 that Kilkenny would again join Oldham on loan until January 2008. The move was blocked following the collapse of Birmingham's purchase of Hossam Ghaly, but was confirmed a few days later. His last match before he returned to Birmingham was an influential performance as Oldham beat Leeds United 3–1 to become the first team that season to win a League game at Elland Road.

=== Leeds United ===
==== 2007–08 season ====
On 4 January 2008 Kilkenny signed for League One team Leeds United on an emergency loan, with a view to ensuring his availability for the next day's game prior to completing a permanent transfer the following week. He made his debut in the 3–0 win over Northampton Town, putting in an impressive performance to get the man of the match award. Kilkenny signed a three-and-a-half-year permanent contract with Leeds on 7 January for a fee of £150,000. He scored his first goal for the club in their 2–0 win against AFC Bournemouth in March. Leeds went on to reach the play-off final that season but lost 1–0 against Doncaster Rovers. He was then called up to the Australian Olympic team during the summer and missed all of pre-season training for Leeds as a result.

==== 2008–09 season ====
After a period out of the team and the sacking of Gary McAllister Kilkenny regained a spot in the Leeds midfield under the stewardship of new manager Simon Grayson late in the 2008–09 season.

His 43rd-minute goal against Yeovil Town on 10 March 2009 was a leading contender for the goal of the season. He followed this up with goals in the 3–2 win against Crewe Alexandra and the 3–1 win against Tranmere Rovers. Kilkenny was part of the Leeds team who were knocked out of the play-off semi-final by Millwall; he injured an ankle and was substituted in the first half of the second leg at Elland Road.

==== 2009–10 season ====
Doncaster made their interest in signing Kilkenny public during the summer but Grayson made it clear that he was not for sale. After again missing pre-season, this time because of ankle trouble, Kilkenny found himself trying to regain fitness and a place on the bench once the season was in full flow. With seven substitutes required for the 2009–10 season, he was used mainly as an impact substitute in the early part of the season.

Kilkenny started his first league game of the season in the top-of-the-table goalless draw with Charlton Athletic and also started the next game in the Football League Trophy win against Darlington. He scored his first goal of the season for Leeds in the 3–1 win against Grimsby Town in the Trophy, "[playing] a give-and-go with Jermaine Beckford before tucking the ball into the far corner". Kilkenny also received the man of the match award in the same game. He scored in his next match, against Brighton & Hove Albion, as well as providing an assist for Beckford, and made it three in five when he scored against his former club Oldham. Kilkenny's fourth goal of the season came in December, with a rare header against Accrington Stanley. A few days later he provided yet another assist when he set up Beckford's first goal against Hartlepool United.

Kilkenny played against Manchester United when Leeds won 1–0 away at Old Trafford on 3 January in the FA Cup. He was at the heart of Leeds' midfield in the 2–2 draw with Tottenham Hotspur in the next round of the FA Cup. He missed the cup replay through injury, and returned to the bench against Carlisle United in the Football League Trophy Northern Final second leg. He came on as a second-half substitute and helped Leeds win the match 3–2, making the score 4–4 on aggregate. The match went to penalties: Kilkenny converted his kick but Leeds lost 6–5.

Kilkenny came back into the starting line-up for the next game against Leyton Orient after fully recovering from his injury. By the time Leeds equalised, via a 95th-minute own goal, Kilkenny had been substituted. He played an instrumental part as Leeds were promoted to the Football League Championship after finishing second in League One and thus earning automatic promotion.

==== 2010–11 season ====
Kilkenny scored his first goal of the 2010–11 season with a penalty in the League Cup match against Lincoln City. He made several assists for Leeds in the first few weeks of the season, including two, for Jonny Howson and Davide Somma, in Leeds' 5–2 defeat against Barnsley. After being ever-present for Leeds, Kilkenny was named on the bench for the game against Sheffield United. In November, Kilkenny entered negotiations with Leeds over extending his contract amid interest from other clubs.

Kilkenny said in December that he was keen to sign a new contract with Leeds. Kilkenny was named in Australia's final 23-man squad for the 2011 Asian Cup in January 2011, so would miss a month of Leeds' season; he said he was "gutted" to be missing the FA Cup tie against his old club Arsenal.

In January he repeated his desire to stay with Leeds, He returned from international duty to be named on the bench against Hull City. He scored his first league goal of the season with a "spectacular 20-yard shot" against Preston North End. At the end of the season, it became clear that club and player were unlikely to agree terms on a new contract, and on 26 May, manager Simon Grayson said that neither Kilkenny nor his agent had responded to the club's offer and he was "keen to move on" in terms of planning for next season. Kilkenny said that despite speculation linking him with a move to the Australian A-League, he wanted "to play at the highest level and that's in Europe".

=== Bristol City ===
On 16 June 2011, Kilkenny showed an interest in moving to Leeds' Yorkshire rivals Hull City. On 24 June, he signed for fellow Championship team Bristol City on a three-year contract after turning down offers from Leeds and from other Championship clubs. Ahead of his return to Elland Road with Bristol City on 17 September, he told the Yorkshire Evening Post he had never wanted to leave the club, and in response to Leeds' chairman Ken Bates' comment that "Kilkenny wanted to leave for a big club and ended up at Bristol City", he felt that Bates "has always got something to say and sometimes he needs to keep quiet." Kilkenny scored his first goal for Bristol City in that match.

On 29 March 2013, Kilkenny reached his 250th career league appearance with Bristol City against Derby County.

=== Preston North End ===
Kilkenny joined Preston North End on 14 November 2013 on an initial one-month loan. On 6 January 2014, he signed for the club permanently until the end of the season. Kilkenny played the whole match as Preston beat Swindon Town in the 2015 League One play-off final to gain promotion to the Championship.

He was released at the end of the 2015–16 season.

=== Melbourne City ===
On 19 July 2016, Kilkenny joined A-League club Melbourne City on a two-year deal. He made his first appearance in a City shirt in a 5–0 friendly match win over Port Melbourne SC on 20 July 2016.

Kilkenny's performances over the season earned him Melbourne City's Player of the Year award for 2016–17.

In January 2018, Melbourne City released Kilkenny.

=== Perth Glory ===
A couple of days after being released by Melbourne City, Kilkenny joined Perth Glory. On 24 February, Kilkenny scored his first goal for Perth Glory in a 2–1 victory against his former team, Melbourne City.

Kilkenny spent 3 1/2 seasons at Perth Glory, before being released at the end of the 2020–21 season.

=== Western United ===
Having been released by Perth Glory, Kilkenny joined Western United ahead of the 2021–22 season. Kilkenny spent two seasons at Western United before departing at the end of the 2022–23 season, to return to Perth to play for Perth Division 1 side Sorrento. At the end of the NPL WA season, Kilkenny retired.

== International career ==
Kilkenny, who was born in England with Irish grandparents, moved to Australia at a young age and grew up there, so was eligible to play internationally for Australia, England and the Republic of Ireland. He played for Ireland at under-19 level and for England under-20s, but shortly before the 2006 World Cup he committed to Australia. He was among a group of young players, selected by manager Guus Hiddink, who trained with the Australian squad in Germany prior to the tournament, and made his international debut on 7 June 2006, coming on as a late substitute in their 3–1 victory in a World Cup warm-up game against Liechtenstein in Ulm, Germany.

In 2007, he was a part of the Australian Olyroos for the 2008 Beijing Olympics qualifying campaign. In June 2008 he was one of 33 players called up for a pre-Olympic training camp prior to selection of the final 18-man squad. He was included in the final 18-man squad and played one game in the Olympics for Australia, who were knocked out in the group stages. After Leeds' FA Cup win over Manchester United put Kilkenny back on the international radar, Australia sent scouts to watch him as a possibility for the 2010 World Cup squad, but manager Pim Verbeek did not select him.

In December 2010, Kilkenny was selected in Australia's 23-man squad for the 2011 Asian Cup. Kilkenny came on as a second-half substitute against United Arab Emirates in a warm-up game for the Asian Cup. He played his first game in the Asian Cup when he came on as a second-half substitute against Bahrain. In the quarter-final match, against reigning champions Iraq, Kilkenny made an appearance in the 109th minute, during a 1–0 win. He was a late substitute in the final, which Australia lost 1–0 to Japan after extra time.

Kilkenny played for Australia in the 3–0 win over New Zealand and goalless draw with Serbia in June 2011.

== Personal life ==
He has four children with his English girlfriend Caprice. His brothers, Gary and Paul Kilkenny supported him very much growing up along with his father and mother. Brian and Janet Kilkenny. Kilkenny is himself a fan of his former side Arsenal but holds an affinity with Leeds United, the team he made the majority of his career appearances with.

In October 2024, Kilkenny joined Football West as their Football Development Officer, overseeing a new academy in partnership with Football Australia.

== Career statistics ==
As of 8 May 2023

Appearances and goals by club, season and competition
| Club | Season | League | | | National Cup (Note: Includes FA Cup, FFA Cup) | | League Cup | | Asia | | Other | | Total | |
| Club | Season | Division | Apps | Goals | Apps | Goals | Apps | Goals | Apps | Goals | Apps | Goals | Apps | Goals |
|---|---|---|---|---|---|---|---|---|---|---|---|---|---|---|
| Birmingham City | 2004–05 | Premier League | 0 | 0 | — | | 0 | 0 | — | | — | | 0 | 0 |
| Birmingham City | 2005–06 | Premier League | 18 | 0 | 4 | 0 | 3 | 0 | — | | — | | 25 | 0 |
| Birmingham City | 2006–07 | Championship | 8 | 0 | 3 | 0 | 3 | 0 | — | | — | | 14 | 0 |
| Birmingham City | Total | | 26 | 0 | 7 | 0 | 6 | 0 | — | | — | | 39 | 0 |
| Oldham Athletic (loan) | 2004–05 | League One | 27 | 4 | 3 | 0 | — | | — | | 4 (Note: Appearances in Football League Trophy) | 1 | 34 | 5 |
| Oldham Athletic | 2007–08 | League One | 20 | 1 | 3 | 1 | 1 | 1 | — | | 1 | 0 | 25 | 3 |
| Oldham Athletic | Total | | 47 | 5 | 6 | 1 | 1 | 1 | — | | 5 | 1 | 59 | 8 |
| Leeds United | 2007–08 | League One | 16 | 1 | — | | — | | — | | 3 (Note: Appearances in League One play-offs) | 0 | 19 | 1 |
| Leeds United | 2008–09 | League One | 30 | 4 | 1 | 0 | 3 | 0 | — | | 4 (Note: Two appearances in Football League Trophy, two in League One play-offs) | 0 | 38 | 4 |
| Leeds United | 2009–10 | League One | 35 | 2 | 5 | 0 | 3 | 0 | — | | 5 | 2 | 48 | 4 |
| Leeds United | 2010–11 | Championship | 37 | 1 | 0 | 0 | 2 | 1 | — | | — | | 39 | 2 |
| Leeds United | Total | | 118 | 8 | 6 | 0 | 8 | 1 | — | | 12 | 2 | 144 | 11 |
| Bristol City | 2011–12 | Championship | 41 | 1 | 1 | 0 | 1 | 0 | — | | — | | 43 | 1 |
| Bristol City | 2012–13 | Championship | 24 | 0 | 0 | 0 | 0 | 0 | — | | — | | 24 | 0 |
| Bristol City | 2013–14 | League One | 3 | 0 | — | | 2 | 0 | — | | 0 | 0 | 5 | 0 |
| Bristol City | Total | | 68 | 1 | 1 | 0 | 3 | 0 | — | | 0 | 0 | 72 | 1 |
| Preston North End | 2013–14 | League One | 27 | 2 | 4 | 0 | — | | — | | 1 | 0 | 32 | 2 |
| Preston North End | 2014–15 | League One | 35 | 0 | 5 | 0 | 2 | 1 | — | | 7 (Note: Four appearances in Football League Trophy, three in League One play-offs) | 0 | 49 | 1 |
| Preston North End | 2015–16 | Championship | 13 | 1 | 0 | 0 | 2 | 0 | — | | — | | 15 | 1 |
| Preston North End | Total | | 75 | 3 | 9 | 0 | 4 | 1 | — | | 8 | 0 | 96 | 4 |
| Melbourne City | 2016–17 | A-League | 25 | 2 | 4 | 0 | — | | — | | 1 | 0 | 30 | 2 |
| Melbourne City | 2017–18 | A-League | 3 | 0 | 3 | 0 | — | | — | | — | | 6 | 0 |
| Melbourne City | Total | | 28 | 2 | 7 | 0 | — | | — | | 1 | 0 | 36 | 2 |
| Perth Glory | 2017–18 | A-League | 10 | 1 | 0 | 0 | — | | — | | — | | 10 | 1 |
| Perth Glory | 2018–19 | A-League | 28 | 6 | 1 | 0 | — | | — | | — | | 29 | 6 |
| Perth Glory | 2019–20 | A-League | 28 | 3 | 1 | 0 | — | | 5 | 1 | — | | 34 | 4 |
| Perth Glory | 2020–21 | A-League | 18 | 1 | — | | — | | — | | — | | 18 | 1 |
| Perth Glory | Total | | 84 | 11 | 2 | 0 | — | | 5 | 1 | — | | 91 | 12 |
| Western United | 2021–22 | A-League Men | 26 | 0 | 1 | 0 | — | | — | | — | | 27 | 0 |
| Western United | 2022–23 | A-League Men | 21 | 1 | 0 | 0 | — | | — | | — | | 21 | 1 |
| Western United | Total | | 47 | 1 | 1 | 0 | — | | — | | — | | 48 | 1 |
| Career total | | | 491 | 31 | 39 | 1 | 22 | 3 | 5 | 1 | 25 | 3 | 582 | 39 |

== Honours ==
Leeds United

- Football League One runner-up: 2009–10

Preston North End

- Football League One play-offs: 2015

Perth Glory

- A-League Premiership: 2018–19

Western United

- A-League Men Championship: 2021–22

Australia

- AFC Asian Cup: runner-up 2011

Sorrento

- Football West State League Division 1: 2024

Individual

- Oldham Athletic Player of the Year: 2004–05
- Melbourne City Player of the Year: 2016–17
- PFA A-League Men Team of the Season: 2018–19, 2021–22
