= Yagoub Mustafa =

South Sudanese footballer

Personal information
- Full name: Yagoub Murghani Mustafa
- Date of birth: 28 February 2000 (age 26)
- Place of birth: Khartoum, Sudan
- Position: Forward

Team information
- Current team: South Melbourne

Youth career
- Inglewood United
- Perth Glory

Senior career*
Years	Team	Apps	(Gls)
2015	Inglewood United	2	(0)
2016–2018	Perth Glory NPL	57	(12)
2017–2018	Perth Glory	1	(0)
2019	Stirling Lions	9	(1)
2020–2021	Perth SC	25	(6)
2022	Bentleigh Greens	18	(6)
2023	Hume City	11	(3)
2023	South Melbourne	10	(2)
2024–	Wollongong Wolves	28	(3)

International career^{‡}
2019–	South Sudan	1	(0)
- * Club domestic league appearances and goals as of 23 January 2025 ‡ National team caps and goals as of 9 October 2019

Yagoub Murghani Mustafa (born 28 February 2000) is a South Sudanese footballer who plays as a forward for Wollongong Wolves.

== Career ==
=== Club career ===
Mustafa started his career with Inglewood United.

=== International career ===
He made his debut for South Sudan national football team on 9 October 2019 in an AFCON qualifier against Seychelles.
