= Chok Dau =

South Sudanese footballer

Personal information
- Full name: Chok Daniel Chol Dau
- Date of birth: 31 December 1998 (age 27)
- Place of birth: Kakuma, Kenya
- Position: Striker

Team information
- Current team: Preston Lions

Senior career*
Years	Team	Apps	(Gls)
2017	Inglewood United	24	(9)
2018	Perth Glory Youth	26	(3)
2019	Inglewood United	23	(11)
2020–2021	Vysočina Jihlava	1	(0)
2020–2021	Vysočina Jihlava B	18	(1)
2022–2023	Perth RedStar	18	(8)
2024–2025	Preston Lions	24	(6)
2025–2026	Heidelberg United	24	(0)
2026-	Bayswater City SC		

International career^{‡}
2019–	South Sudan	2	(0)
- * Club domestic league appearances and goals as of 18 September 2025 ‡ National team caps and goals as of 14 January 2021

Chok Daniel Chol Dau (born 31 December 1998) is a professional footballer who plays as a striker for National Premier Leagues Victoria club Heidelberg United. Born in Kenya, he plays for the South Sudan national team.
