= 2018–19 Sydney FC season =

Sydney FC
2018–19 season
- Chairman: Scott Barlow
- Manager: Steve Corica
- Stadium: Sydney Cricket Ground, Netstrata Jubilee Stadium and Leichhardt Oval
- A-League: 2nd
- A-League Finals Series: Champions
- FFA Cup: Runners-up
- AFC Champions League: Group stage
- Top goalscorer: League: Adam Le Fondre (18 goals); All: Adam Le Fondre (23 goals)
- Highest home attendance: 30,588 vs Western Sydney Wanderers (27 October 2018)
- Lowest home attendance: 6,261 vs Melbourne City (17 March 2019)
- Average home league attendance: 13,464
Home colours	Away colours	Third colours

The 2018–19 Sydney FC season was the club's 14th season since its establishment in 2004. The club participated in the A-League for the 14th time and the AFC Champions League for the fifth time.

== Players ==
=== Squad information ===
Note: Flags indicate national team as defined under FIFA eligibility rules; some limited exceptions apply. Players may hold more than one non-FIFA nationality.

No.	Pos.	Nation	Player
1	GK	AUS	Andrew Redmayne
2	DF	AUS	Aaron Calver
3	DF	AUS	Ben Warland
4	DF	AUS	Alex Wilkinson
5	DF	NED	Jop van der Linden
6	MF	AUS	Joshua Brillante
7	DF	AUS	Michael Zullo
8	MF	AUS	Paulo Retre
9	FW	ENG	Adam Le Fondre
10	FW	SRB	Miloš Ninković
11	MF	AUS	Daniel De Silva (on loan from Central Coast Mariners)
12	FW	AUS	Trent Buhagiar
13	MF	AUS	Brandon O'Neill
14	FW	AUS	Alex Brosque (Captain)
16	FW	IRI	Reza Ghoochannejhad (on loan from APOEL FC)

No.	Pos.	Nation	Player
17	MF	AUS	Anthony Cáceres (on loan from Manchester City)
18	DF	AUS	Jacob Tratt
19	MF	AUS	Chris Zuvela
20	GK	AUS	Alex Cisak
21	FW	AUS	Mitch Austin
22	MF	NED	Siem de Jong (on loan from Ajax Amsterdam)
23	DF	AUS	Rhyan Grant
24	MF	AUS	Cammy Devlin
25	DF	AUS	Joel King
27	MF	AUS	Jerry Skotadis (Scholarship)
28	FW	AUS	Marco Tilio (Scholarship)
29	MF	AUS	Ryan Teague (Scholarship)
30	GK	AUS	Tom Heward-Belle
31	FW	AUS	Luke Ivanovic

==== From youth squad ====
N	Pos.	Nat.	Name	Age	Notes
24	MF	(Australia)	Cammy Devlin	20	
25	DF	(Australia)	Joel King	17	
27	MF	(Australia)	Jerry Skotadis	18	
28	FW	(Australia)	Marco Tilio	17	
29	MF	(Australia)	Ryan Teague	16	
30	GK	(Australia)	Tom Heward-Belle	21	
31	FW	(Australia)	Luke Ivanovic	18	

=== Transfers in ===
No.	Position	Player	Transferred from	Type/fee	Contract length	Date	Ref
12	FW	Trent Buhagiar	Central Coast Mariners	Free transfer	2 years	10 May 2018	
11	MF	Daniel De Silva	Central Coast Mariners	Loan	1 year	25 July 2018	
5	DF	(Netherlands) Jop van der Linden	(Netherlands) AZ Alkmaar	Free transfer	1 year	27 July 2018	
9	FW	(England) Adam Le Fondre	(England) Bolton Wanderers	Free transfer	3 years	17 August 2018	
22	FW	(Netherlands) Siem de Jong	(Netherlands) Ajax Amsterdam	Loan	1 year	23 August 2018	
18	DF	Jacob Tratt	(Australia) Sutherland Sharks	Free transfer		9 November 2018	
17	MF	Anthony Cáceres	(England) Manchester City	Loan	1 year	2 January 2019	
16	FW	(Iran) Reza Ghoochannejhad	(Cyprus) APOEL	Loan	1 year	29 January 2019	
21	FW	Mitch Austin	Newcastle Jets	Free transfer	1 year	31 January 2019	

=== Transfers out ===
No.	Position	Player	Transferred to	Type/fee	Date	Ref
5	DF	(Netherlands) Jordy Buijs	(Japan) V-Varen Nagasaki	End of contract	9 May 2018	
26	DF	Luke Wilkshire	(Australia) Wollongong Wolves	End of contract	9 May 2018	
18	FW	Matt Simon	Central Coast Mariners	Free transfer	10 May 2018	
12	MF	(Portugal) Fábio Ferreira	Perth Glory	End of contract	6 June 2018	
16	MF	Anthony Kalik	(Croatia) Hajduk Split	Loan return	6 June 2018	
17	MF	David Carney		End of contract	6 June 2018	
11	MF	(Poland) Adrian Mierzejewski	(China) Changchun Yatai	$1,300 000	5 July 2018	
9	FW	(Brazil) Bobô	(Turkey) Alanyaspor	$800,000	7 July 2018	
21	FW	Charles Lokolingoy		Free transfer	31 January 2019	

=== Contract extensions ===
No.	Name	Position	Duration	Date	Notes
4	Alex Wilkinson	DF	2 years	8 May 2018	
19	Chris Zuvela	MF	1 year	10 May 2018	
14	Alex Brosque	FW	1 year	19 May 2018	
10	(Serbia) Miloš Ninković	FW	2 years	31 May 2018	
9	(Brazil) Bobô	FW	1 year	4 June 2018	
21	Charles Lokolingoy	FW	1 year	12 June 2018	
8	Paulo Retre	MF	1 year	28 August 2018	
3	Ben Warland	DF	2 years	9 October 2018	
18	Jacob Tratt	DF	1 year	8 January 2019	
23	Rhyan Grant	DF	3 years	6 February 2019	
13	Brandon O'Neill	MF	2 years	7 February 2019	
31	Luke Ivanovic	FW	1 year	30 April 2019	
25	Joel King	DF	1 year	9 May 2019	

== Technical staff ==
Position	Name
Head Coach	(Australia) Steve Corica
Assistant Coach	(Australia) Ufuk Talay
Goalkeeping Coach	(Australia) John Crawley

== Squad statistics ==
=== Appearances and goals ===
N	Pos.	Nat.	Name	Total					A-League					A-League Finals Series					FFA Cup					AFC Champions League
N	Pos.	Nat.	Name	Apps	Goals	Yellow card	Second yellow card	Red card	Apps	Goals	Yellow card	Second yellow card	Red card	Apps	Goals	Yellow card	Second yellow card	Red card	Apps	Goals	Yellow card	Second yellow card	Red card	Apps	Goals	Yellow card	Second yellow card	Red card
1	GK	(Australia)	Andrew Redmayne	34	0	0	0	0	24+0	0	0	0	0	0+0	0	0	0	0	5+0	0	0	0	0	5+0	0	0	0	0
2	DF	(Australia)	Aaron Calver	23	2	6	0	0	12+5	2	5	0	0	0+0	0	0	0	0	1+2	0	0	0	0	3+0	0	1	0	0
3	DF	(Australia)	Ben Warland	11	1	1	0	0	7+1	0	1	0	0	0+0	0	0	0	0	1+0	1	0	0	0	2+0	0	0	0	0
4	DF	(Australia)	Alex Wilkinson	31	0	1	0	0	23+0	0	1	0	0	0+0	0	0	0	0	4+0	0	0	0	0	4+0	0	0	0	0
5	DF	(Netherlands)	Jop van der Linden	12	0	4	0	0	8+0	0	4	0	0	0+0	0	0	0	0	4+0	0	0	0	0	0+0	0	0	0	0
6	MF	(Australia)	Joshua Brillante	31	0	6	0	0	21+1	0	5	0	0	0+0	0	0	0	0	5+0	0	1	0	0	4+0	0	0	0	0
7	DF	(Australia)	Michael Zullo	32	1	8	0	0	23+0	1	6	0	0	0+0	0	0	0	0	5+0	0	1	0	0	4+0	0	1	0	0
8	MF	(Australia)	Paulo Retre	28	1	6	0	0	13+5	1	3	0	0	0+0	0	0	0	0	3+2	0	1	0	0	4+1	0	2	0	0
9	FW	(England)	Adam Le Fondre	32	20	4	0	0	24+0	15	3	0	0	0+0	0	0	0	0	3+0	3	1	0	0	5+0	2	0	0	0
10	FW	(Serbia)	Miloš Ninković	32	3	2	0	0	23+0	2	2	0	0	0+0	0	0	0	0	5+0	1	0	0	0	3+1	0	0	0	0
11	MF	(Australia)	Daniel De Silva	21	3	0	0	0	4+11	2	0	0	0	0+0	0	0	0	0	1+1	1	0	0	0	2+2	0	0	0	0
12	FW	(Australia)	Trent Buhagiar	4	4	1	0	0	0+0	0	0	0	0	0+0	0	0	0	0	4+0	4	1	0	0	0+0	0	0	0	0
13	MF	(Australia)	Brandon O'Neill	34	3	6	0	0	24+0	2	4	0	0	0+0	0	0	0	0	5+0	0	2	0	0	5+0	1	0	0	0
14	FW	(Australia)	Alex Brosque	28	10	7	0	0	15+6	6	5	0	0	0+0	0	0	0	0	3+1	3	2	0	0	1+2	1	0	0	0
16	FW	(Iran)	Reza Ghoochannejhad	13	1	0	0	0	5+2	1	0	0	0	0+0	0	0	0	0	0+0	0	0	0	0	5+1	0	0	0	0
17	MF	(Australia)	Anthony Cáceres	16	0	0	0	0	8+3	0	0	0	0	0+0	0	0	0	0	0+0	0	0	0	0	5+0	0	0	0	0
18	DF	(Australia)	Jacob Tratt	9	2	1	0	0	2+5	2	1	0	0	0+0	0	0	0	0	0+0	0	0	0	0	2+0	0	0	0	0
19	MF	(Australia)	Chris Zuvela	2	0	1	0	0	0+0	0	0	0	0	0+0	0	0	0	0	0+2	0	1	0	0	0+0	0	0	0	0
20	GK	(Australia)	Alex Cisak	1	0	0	0	0	0+0	0	0	0	0	0+0	0	0	0	0	0+1	0	0	0	0	0+0	0	0	0	0
21	FW	(Australia)	Mitch Austin	4	0	0	0	0	0+2	0	0	0	0	0+0	0	0	0	0	0+0	0	0	0	0	0+2	0	0	0	0
22	MF	(Netherlands)	Siem de Jong	17	6	1	0	0	9+4	4	1	0	0	0+0	0	0	0	0	2+0	1	0	0	0	2+0	1	0	0	0
23	DF	(Australia)	Rhyan Grant	24	0	4	0	0	16+0	0	4	0	0	0+0	0	0	0	0	4+0	0	0	0	0	4+0	0	0	0	0
24	MF	(Australia)	Cammy Devlin†	8	1	1	0	0	0+6	1	1	0	0	0+0	0	0	0	0	0+1	0	0	0	0	1+0	0	0	0	0
25	DF	(Australia)	Joel King†	2	0	0	0	0	0+0	0	0	0	0	0+0	0	0	0	0	0+0	0	0	0	0	1+1	0	0	0	0
27	MF	(Australia)	Jerry Skotadis†	1	0	0	0	0	0+0	0	0	0	0	0+0	0	0	0	0	0+0	0	0	0	0	0+1	0	0	0	0
28	FW	(Australia)	Marco Tilio†	1	0	0	0	0	0+0	0	0	0	0	0+0	0	0	0	0	0+0	0	0	0	0	0+1	0	0	0	0
29	MF	(Australia)	Ryan Teague†	0	0	0	0	0	0+0	0	0	0	0	0+0	0	0	0	0	0+0	0	0	0	0	0+0	0	0	0	0
30	GK	(Australia)	Tom Heward-Belle†	1	0	0	0	0	0+0	0	0	0	0	0+0	0	0	0	0	0+0	0	0	0	0	1+0	0	0	0	0
31	FW	(Australia)	Luke Ivanovic†	15	1	0	0	0	1+9	1	0	0	0	0+0	0	0	0	0	0+0	0	0	0	0	1+4	0	0	0	0
32	FW	(Australia)	Jordi Swibel†	0	0	0	0	0	0+0	0	0	0	0	0+0	0	0	0	0	0+0	0	0	0	0	0+0	0	0	0	0
33	DF	(Australia)	Liam McGing†	1	0	0	0	0	0+0	0	0	0	0	0+0	0	0	0	0	0+0	0	0	0	0	1+0	0	0	0	0
34	DF	(Australia)	Patrick Scibilio†	1	0	0	0	0	0+0	0	0	0	0	0+0	0	0	0	0	0+0	0	0	0	0	1+0	0	0	0	0
37	FW	(Australia)	Hamish Lamberton†	0	0	0	0	0	0+0	0	0	0	0	0+0	0	0	0	0	0+0	0	0	0	0	0+0	0	0	0	0
Players no longer at the club
21	FW	(Australia)	Charles Lokolingoy	4	0	1	0	0	0+0	0	0	0	0	0+0	0	0	0	0	0+4	0	1	0	0	0+0	0	0	0	0

- Last updated: 21 May 2019
- Source: au.soccerway.com
- (yellow card) = Number of bookings; (second yellow card) = Number of sending offs after a second yellow card; (red card) = Number of sending offs by a direct red card.

† = Scholarship or NPL/NYL-listed player

== Preseason and friendlies ==
6 July 2018 2018 Free Trade Port Super Champions Cup	Changchun Yatai (China)	0–1	(Australia) Sydney FC Youth	Haikou, China
		Report	Devlin 7'	Stadium: Haikou Stadium

8 July 2018 2018 Free Trade Port Super Champions Cup	Shanghai Greenland Shenhua (China)	2–0	(Australia) Sydney FC Youth	Haikou, China
20:30 CST	Ba 8'; Romero 88'	Report		Stadium: Haikou Stadium

18 July 2018	Sydney FC (Australia)	5–0	(Australia) Dunbar Rovers	Sydney, Australia
19:30 AEST	Gallegos 11'; Brosque 20'; Ninković 42'; Brillante 45'; Buhagiar 49'	Report		Stadium: North Sydney Oval; Attendance: 1,200; Referee: Steve Lucas

25 July 2018	Sydney FC (Australia)	3–0	(Australia) Sutherland Sharks	Sydney, Australia
19:30 AEST	Buhagiar 45'; Lokolingoy 78'; O'Neill 86' (pen.)	Report		Stadium: Jubilee Oval

7 August 2018	Sydney FC (Australia)	0–0	(Australia) Hakoah Sydney City East	Sydney, Australia
19:30 AEST		Report		Stadium: Leichhardt Oval

15 August 2018	Brisbane Roar (Australia)	1–1	(Australia) Sydney FC	Gold Coast, Australia
	Mauk 78'	Report	Buhagiar 17'	Stadium: Robina Stadium

28 August 2018	Sydney FC (Australia)	3–0	India U23	Sydney, Australia
	Brosque 37'; Le Fondre 43'; Buhagiar 86'	Report		Stadium: Macquarie University Sports Fields

12 September 2018	Sydney FC (Australia)	2–1	(Australia) Newcastle Jets	Sydney, Australia
	Le Fondre 12', 55' (pen.)	Report	Thurgate 30'	Stadium: Leichhardt Oval

29 September 2018	Sydney FC (Australia)	2–1	(New Zealand) Wellington Phoenix	Sydney, Australia
11:30	Le Fondre (?); Calver 73'	Report	Krishna (?)	Stadium: Macquarie University Sports Fields; Attendance: 0 (behind closed doors); Referee: Kurt Ams

11 October 2018	Sydney FC (Australia)	2–0	(Australia) Central Coast Mariners	Sydney, Australia
19:30	van der Linden 15'; Brosque 36'	Report		Stadium: Jubilee Oval; Attendance: 0 (behind closed doors)

== Competitions ==
=== Overall ===
Competition	Started round	Final position / round	First match	Last match
A-League	—	2nd	19 October 2018	27 April 2019
A-League Finals	Semi-finals	Champions	12 May 2019	19 May 2019
FFA Cup	Round of 32	Runners-up	1 August 2018	30 October 2018
AFC Champions League	Group stage	Group stage	6 March 2019	21 May 2019

=== A-League ===
==== League table ====
Pos	Team	Pld	W	D	L	GF	GA	GD	Pts	Qualification
1	Perth Glory	27	18	6	3	56	23	+33	60	Qualification for 2020 AFC Champions League group stage and Finals series (Note: The top two teams enter the Finals series at the semi-finals, while the teams ranked third to sixth enter the Finals series at the elimination-finals.)
2	Sydney FC (C)	27	16	4	7	43	29	+14	52	Qualification for 2020 AFC Champions League group stage and Finals series
3	Melbourne Victory	27	15	5	7	50	32	+18	50	Qualification for 2020 AFC Champions League preliminary round 2 and Finals series
4	Adelaide United	27	12	8	7	37	32	+5	44	Qualification for Finals series
5	Melbourne City	27	11	7	9	39	32	+7	40	Qualification for Finals series
6	Wellington Phoenix (Note: Wellington Phoenix cannot qualify for the AFC Champions League as they are not recognised as an AFC club.)	27	11	7	9	46	43	+3	40	Qualification for Finals series
7	Newcastle Jets	27	10	5	12	40	36	+4	35	
8	Western Sydney Wanderers	27	6	6	15	42	54	−12	24	
9	Brisbane Roar	27	4	6	17	38	71	−33	18	
10	Central Coast Mariners	27	3	4	20	31	70	−39	13	

Source: A-Leagues
Rules for classification: 1) points; 2) goal difference; 3) number of goals scored.
(C) Champions

==== Results summary ====
Overall								Home						Away					
Pld	W	D	L	GF	GA	GD	Pts	W	D	L	GF	GA	GD	W	D	L	GF	GA	GD
27	16	4	7	43	29	+14	52	9	1	3	22	13	+9	7	3	4	21	16	+5

Last updated: 6 April 2019.
Source: ultimatealeague.com

==== Results by round ====
Round	1	2	3	4	5	6	7	8	9	10	11	12	13	14	15	16	17	18	19	20	21	22	23	24	25	26	27
Ground	A	H	A	A	H	A	H	A	A	H	H	A	H	H	A	A	H	A	H	A	H	H	A	H	A	H	A
Result	D	W	W	D	L	W	L	W	W	W	W	L	W	W	W	L	W	L	D	W	W	L	W	W	D	W	L
Position	7	1	1	2	3	3	3	3	3	3	3	3	3	3	2	3	3	3	3	2	2	2	2	2	2	2	2

Updated to match(es) played on 6 April 2019. Source: ultimatealeague.com
A = Away; H = Home; W = Win; D = Draw; L = Loss

==== Matches ====
Win Draw Loss

19 October 2018 1	Adelaide United	1–1	Sydney FC	Adelaide
19:20 ACDT	Galloway 45+3'	Report	Le Fondre 78'	Stadium: Coopers Stadium; Attendance: 10,018; Referee: Jarred Gillett

27 October 2018 2	Sydney FC	2–0	Western Sydney Wanderers	Sydney
19:50 AEDT	Le Fondre 4'; Brosque 53'	Report		Stadium: Sydney Cricket Ground; Attendance: 30,588; Referee: Chris Beath

2 November 2018 3	Melbourne City	0–3	Sydney FC	Melbourne
19:50 AEDT		Report	Retre 16'; Le Fondre 61', 90'	Stadium: AAMI Park; Attendance: 12,086; Referee: Adam Kersey

10 November 2018 4	Newcastle Jets	1–1	Sydney FC	Newcastle
19:50 AEDT	Cowburn 87'	Report	Brosque 20'	Stadium: McDonald Jones Stadium; Attendance: 11,415; Referee: Shaun Evans

25 November 2018 5	Sydney FC	1–2	Melbourne Victory	Sydney
17:00 AEDT	Le Fondre 35'	Report	Toivonen 23'; Honda 71' (pen.)	Stadium: Jubilee Oval; Attendance: 19,081; Referee: Peter Green

1 December 2018 6	Central Coast Mariners	1–2	Sydney FC	Gosford
17:35 AEDT	Simon 16'	Report	Le Fondre 42' (pen.); O'Neill 65'	Stadium: Central Coast Stadium; Attendance: 8,386; Referee: Daniel Elder

8 December 2018 7	Sydney FC	1–3	Wellington Phoenix	Sydney
17:35 AEDT	Zullo 89'	Report	Krishna 21', 30'; Taylor 38'	Stadium: Jubilee Oval; Attendance: 10,101; Referee: Jonathan Barreiro

15 December 2018 8	Western Sydney Wanderers	1–3	Sydney FC	Sydney
19:50 AEDT	Riera 23'	Report	Brosque 45+1'; de Jong 57'; Tratt 81'	Stadium: ANZ Stadium; Attendance: 18,043; Referee: Jarred Gillett

21 December 2018 9	Perth Glory	1–2	Sydney FC	Perth
20:30 WST	Ikonomidis 90'	Report	Le Fondre 18'; De Silva 87'	Stadium: NIB Stadium; Attendance: 10,356; Referee: Jonathon Barreiro

29 December 2018 10	Sydney FC	2–1	Brisbane Roar	Sydney
19:50 AEDT	Le Fondre 16', 55'	Report	McKay 35'	Stadium: Jubilee Oval; Attendance: 12,216; Referee: Alex King

4 January 2019 11	Sydney FC	5–2	Central Coast Mariners	Sydney
19:50 AEDT	Brosque 49', 58', 64'; Le Fondre 52' (pen.); Calver 90'	Report	Pain 17'; O'Neill 66'	Stadium: Jubilee Oval; Attendance: 12,053; Referee: Jonathon Barreiro

10 January 2019 12	Perth Glory	3–1	Sydney FC	Perth
19:00 WST	Chianese 13', 24'; Santalab 45+3'	Report	Le Fondre 68'	Stadium: HBF Park; Attendance: 9,521; Referee: Jarred Gillett

13 January 2019 13	Sydney FC	2–1	Adelaide United	Sydney
19:50 AEDT	de Jong 13'; Tratt 48'	Report	Goodwin 50' (pen.)	Stadium: Jubilee Oval; Attendance: 11,560; Referee: Adam Kersey

19 January 2019 14	Sydney FC	1–0	Newcastle Jets	Sydney
17:35 AEDT	Boogaard 44' (o.g.)	Report		Stadium: Jubilee Oval; Attendance: 12,681; Referee: Adam Fielding

23 January 2019 15	Wellington Phoenix	0–1	Sydney FC	Wellington
19:35 NZDT		Report	de Jong 25'	Stadium: Westpac Stadium; Attendance: 8,961; Referee: Daniel Elder

26 January 2019 16	Melbourne Victory	2–1	Sydney FC	Melbourne
19:50 AEDT	Toivonen 20'; Troisi 58'	Report	Ninkovic 63'	Stadium: AAMI Park; Attendance: 21,085; Referee: Shaun Evans

3 February 2019 17	Sydney FC	2–0	Melbourne City	Sydney
17:00 AEDT	Ivanovic 9'; Le Fondre 86'	Report		Stadium: Jubilee Oval; Attendance: 13,029; Referee: Jarred Gillett

8 February 2019 18	Brisbane Roar	2–1	Sydney FC	Brisbane
19:50 AEST	Mikkelsen 77'; Wenzel-Halls 90'	Report	De Silva 55'	Stadium: Suncorp Stadium; Attendance: 8,356; Referee: Jonathan Barreiro

17 February 2019 19	Sydney FC	1–1	Central Coast Mariners	Sydney
17:50 AEDT	Le Fondre 76' (pen.)	Report	O'Neill 36'	Stadium: Leichhardt Oval; Attendance: 12,188; Referee: Jarred Gillett

23 February 2019 20	Wellington Phoenix	0–1	Sydney FC	Sydney
19:35 NZDT		Report	Le Fondre 65' (pen.)	Stadium: Campbelltown Stadium; Attendance: 5,115; Referee: Shaun Evans

1 March 2019 21	Sydney FC	2–0	Adelaide United	Sydney
19:50 AEDT	Ghoochannejhad 15'; Devlin 90+4'	Report		Stadium: Leichhardt Oval; Attendance: 11,217; Referee: Kurt Ams

17 March 2019 22	Sydney FC	0–2	Melbourne City	Sydney
19:00 AEDT		Report	Harrison 62'; Retre 79' (o.g.)	Stadium: Leichhardt Oval; Attendance: 6,261; Referee: Shaun Evans

29 March 2019 23	Brisbane Roar	1–3	Sydney FC	Brisbane
19:50 AEST	Bautheac 68'	Report	Calver 1'; Le Fondre 77'; de Jong 89'	Stadium: Suncorp Stadium; Attendance: 8,059; Referee: Stephen Lucas

6 April 2019 24	Sydney FC	2–1	Melbourne Victory	Sydney
19:50 AEDT	O'Neill 6'; Ninkovic 90+3'	Report	Barbarouses 18'	Stadium: Sydney Cricket Ground; Attendance: 14,155; Referee: Alex King

13 April 2019 25	Western Sydney Wanderers	1–1	Sydney FC	Sydney
19:50 AEST	Baumjohann 57'	Report	Brosque 7'	Stadium: ANZ Stadium; Attendance: 21,984; Referee: Shaun Evans

18 April 2019 26	Sydney FC	1–0	Perth Glory	Sydney
19:50 AEST	Le Fondre 37'	Report		Stadium: Jubilee Oval; Attendance: 11,227; Referee: Chris Beath

27 April 2019 27	Newcastle Jets	2–0	Sydney FC	Newcastle
17:35 AEST	Kantarovski 41'; Petratos 53'	Report		Stadium: McDonald Jones Stadium; Attendance: 10,260; Referee: Peter Green

==== Finals series ====
12 May 2019 Semi-final	Sydney FC	6–1	Melbourne Victory	Sydney
19:00 AEST	Calver 3'; Brosque 43'; Broxham 45+2' (o.g.); Le Fondre 63' (pen.), 68'; Ninkovic 88'	Report	Toivonen 90+1'	Stadium: Netstrata Jubilee Stadium; Attendance: 12,141; Referee: Chris Beath

19 May 2019 Grand Final	Perth Glory	0–0 (a.e.t.) (1–4 p)	Sydney FC	Perth
16:30 AWST		Report		Stadium: Optus Stadium; Attendance: 56,371; Referee: Shaun Evans
	Penalties
	(penalty scored) Juande; (penalty missed) Keogh; (penalty missed) Santalab		(penalty scored) Le Fondre; (penalty scored) O'Neill; (penalty scored) Grant; (penalty scored) Ghoochannejhad

=== FFA Cup ===
1 August 2018 Round of 32	Rockdale City Suns (New South Wales)	2–4	(New South Wales) Sydney FC	Sydney
19:30 AEST	Gaitatzis 6'; Alameddine 76'	Report	De Silva 30'; Warland 48'; Brosque 51', 64'	Stadium: Ilinden Sports Centre; Attendance: 4,489; Referee: Ben Abraham

21 August 2018 Round of 16	Cairns FC (Queensland)	1–2	(New South Wales) Sydney FC	Cairns
19:30 AEST	Cavanah 16'	Report	Brosque 62' (pen.); Buhagiar 66'	Stadium: Barlow Park; Attendance: 3,950; Referee: Chris Beath

19 September 2018 Quarter-finals	Avondale FC (Victoria (state))	2–4 (a.e.t.)	(New South Wales) Sydney FC	Melbourne
19:30 AEST	Boland 56', 61'	Report	Buhagiar 17', 29'; Ninkovic 105'; Le Fondre 114'	Stadium: ABD Stadium; Attendance: 1,566; Referee: Jonathan Barreiro

6 October 2018 Semi-finals	Western Sydney Wanderers (New South Wales)	0–3	(New South Wales) Sydney FC	Sydney
19:30 AEST		Report	Buhagiar 49'; de Jong 64'; Le Fondre 76' (pen.)	Stadium: Panthers Stadium; Attendance: 14,436; Referee: Daniel Elder

30 October 2018 Final	Adelaide United (South Australia)	2–1	(New South Wales) Sydney FC	Adelaide
19:00 ACDT	Goodwin 25', 74'	Report	Le Fondre 28' (pen.)	Stadium: Hindmarsh Stadium; Attendance: 14,448; Referee: Jarred Gillett

=== AFC Champions League ===
==== Group stage ====
Pos	Team	Pld	W	D	L	GF	GA	GD	Pts	Qualification
1	(South Korea) Ulsan Hyundai	6	3	2	1	5	7	−2	11	Advance to knockout stage
2	(China) Shanghai SIPG	6	2	3	1	13	8	+5	9	Advance to knockout stage
3	(Japan) Kawasaki Frontale	6	2	2	2	9	6	+3	8	
4	(Australia) Sydney FC	6	0	3	3	5	11	−6	3	

Source: AFC
Rules for classification: Group stage tiebreakers

6 March 2019 1	Sydney FC (Australia)	0–0	(South Korea) Ulsan Hyundai	Sydney, Australia
20:00 AEDT		Report		Stadium: Jubilee Oval; Attendance: 4,039; Referee: Khamis Al-Kuwari (Qatar)

13 March 2019 2	Kawasaki Frontale (Japan)	1–0	(Australia) Sydney FC	Kawasaki, Japan
19:00 JST	Saitō 83'	Report		Stadium: Todoroki Athletics Stadium; Attendance: 11,278; Referee: Valentin Kovalenko (Uzbekistan)

10 April 2019 3	Sydney FC (Australia)	3–3	(China) Shanghai SIPG	Sydney, Australia
19:30 AEST	de Jong 3'; Le Fondre 32' (pen.); Brosque 84'	Report	Lü 27'; Yu Hai 36'; Elkeson 89'	Stadium: Jubilee Oval; Attendance: 7,154; Referee: Alireza Faghani (Iran)

23 April 2019 4	Shanghai SIPG (China)	2–2	(Australia) Sydney FC	Shanghai, China
19:30 CST	Elkeson 47'; Wang 59'	Report	O'Neill 33'; Le Fondre 62'	Stadium: Shanghai Stadium; Attendance: 21,989; Referee: Abdulrahman Al-Jassim (Qatar)

7 May 2019 5	Ulsan Hyundai (South Korea)	1–0	(Australia) Sydney FC	Ulsan, South Korea
19:00 KST	Diskerud 59'	Report		Stadium: Ulsan Munsu Football Stadium; Attendance: 1,520; Referee: Ali Sabah (Iraq)

21 May 2019 6	Sydney FC (Australia)	0–4	(Japan) Kawasaki Frontale	Sydney, Australia
20:00 AEST		Report	Wakizaka 9', 20'; Tanaka 28'; Leandro Damião 59'	Stadium: Jubilee Oval; Attendance: 3,813; Referee: Mohanad Qasim Sarray (Iraq)

== International selections ==
The following players were selected for the Socceroos:

- Rhyan Grant (Korea/Lebanon friendlies, 2019 AFC Asian Cup, Korea friendly)
- Brandon O'Neill (Korea friendly)
- Andrew Redmayne (Korea friendly)
- Joshua Brillante (Korea friendly)

== End-of-season awards ==
On 1 June 2019, Sydney FC hosted their annual Sky Blue Ball and presented ten awards on the night.

Award	Men's	Women's
Player of the Year	Brandon O'Neill (Men's); Luke Ivanovic (U-20's)	Teresa Polias
Member's Player of the Year	Rhyan Grant	Elizabeth Ralston
Golden Boot	Adam Le Fondre	Caitlin Foord
Rising Star	Ryan Teague	Princess Ibini
Chairman's Award	Jessica Allan (General Manager, Commercial Partnerships)	
