= 2018–19 A-League =

42nd season of top-tier soccer league in Australia

A-League
- Season: 2018–19
- Dates: 19 October 2018 – 19 May 2019
- Champions: Sydney FC (4th title)
- Premiers: Perth Glory (1st title)
- Champions League: Perth Glory; Sydney FC; Melbourne Victory
- Matches: 135
- Goals: 422 (3.13 per match)
- Top goalscorer: Roy Krishna (18 goals)
- Biggest home win: Melbourne City 5–0 Central Coast Mariners (26 April 2019); Perth Glory 5–0 Wellington Phoenix (28 April 2019)
- Biggest away win: Central Coast Mariners 2–8 Wellington Phoenix (9 March 2019)
- Highest scoring: Central Coast Mariners 2–8 Wellington Phoenix (9 March 2019)
- Highest attendance: 40,504; Melbourne Victory vs. Melbourne City (20 October 2018)
- Lowest attendance: 3,703; Central Coast Mariners vs. Wellington Phoenix (9 March 2019)
- Average attendance: 10,411 ( 260)

The 2018–19 A-League was the 42nd season of national level soccer in Australia, and the 14th since the establishment of the A-League in 2004. The regular season commenced on 19 October 2018 and concluded on 28 April 2019. The play-offs began on 3 May 2019 and ended with the Grand Final on 19 May 2019. Sydney FC defeated Perth Glory in the Grand Final.

== Clubs ==

Team	City	Home Ground	Capacity
Adelaide United	Adelaide	Coopers Stadium	16,500
Brisbane Roar	Brisbane	Suncorp Stadium	52,500
Central Coast Mariners	Gosford	Central Coast Stadium	20,059
Melbourne City	Melbourne	AAMI Park	30,050
Melbourne Victory	Melbourne	Marvel Stadium; AAMI Park; GMHBA Stadium	56,347; 30,050; 36,000
Newcastle Jets	Newcastle	McDonald Jones Stadium	33,000
Perth Glory	Perth	HBF Park	20,500
Sydney FC	Sydney	Sydney Cricket Ground; Jubilee Oval; Leichhardt Oval	48,000; 20,500; 20,000
Wellington Phoenix	Wellington	Westpac Stadium	34,500
Western Sydney Wanderers	Sydney	ANZ Stadium; Spotless Stadium	84,000; 24,000

=== Personnel and kits ===
Team	Manager	Captain	Kit manufacturer	Kit sponsor
Adelaide United	(Germany) Marco Kurz	(Spain) Isaías	Macron	IGA
Brisbane Roar	(Wales) Darren Davies (caretaker)	(Australia) Matt McKay	Umbro	Actron Air
Central Coast Mariners	(Australia) Alen Stajcic (caretaker)	(Australia) Matt Simon	Umbro	Masterfoods & State Road Constructions
Melbourne City	(England) Warren Joyce	(Australia) Scott Jamieson	Nike	Etihad Airways
Melbourne Victory	(Australia) Kevin Muscat	(Australia) Carl Valeri	Adidas	Metricon
Newcastle Jets	(Scotland) Ernie Merrick	(Australia) Nigel Boogaard	Viva Sports	Ledman Group
Perth Glory	(Australia) Tony Popovic	(Spain) Diego Castro	Macron	QBE Insurance
Sydney FC	(Australia) Steve Corica	(Australia) Alex Brosque	Puma	The Star
Wellington Phoenix	(Australia) Marko Rudan	(New Zealand) Andrew Durante	Adidas	Huawei
Western Sydney Wanderers	(Germany) Markus Babbel	(Australia) Brendan Hamill	Nike	Centuria

=== Managerial changes ===
Team	Outgoing manager	Manner of departure	Date of vacancy	Position on table	Incoming manager	Date of appointment
Sydney FC	(Australia) Graham Arnold	Signed by Australia	8 March 2018	Pre-season	(Australia) Steve Corica	16 May 2018
Central Coast Mariners	(Republic of Ireland) Wayne O'Sullivan (caretaker)	End of caretaker spell	14 April 2018	Pre-season	(England) Mike Mulvey	July 2018
Western Sydney Wanderers	(Spain) Josep Gombau	Sacked	19 April 2018	Pre-season	(Germany) Markus Babbel	19 May 2018
Perth Glory	(England) Kenny Lowe	Sacked	20 April 2018	Pre-season	(Australia) Tony Popovic	11 May 2018
Wellington Phoenix	(England) Chris Greenacre (caretaker)	End of caretaker spell	30 May 2018	Pre-season	(Australia) Marko Rudan	30 May 2018
Brisbane Roar	(Australia) John Aloisi	Resigned	28 December 2018	9th	(Wales) Darren Davies (caretaker)	28 December 2018
Central Coast Mariners	(England) Mike Mulvey	Sacked	9 March 2019	10th	(Australia) Alen Stajcic (caretaker)	12 March 2019

=== Foreign players ===
Club	Visa 1	Visa 2	Visa 3	Visa 4	Visa 5	Non-Visa foreigner(s)	Former player(s)
Adelaide United	(Denmark) Ken Ilsø	(Denmark) Michael Jakobsen	(Germany) Mirko Boland	(Netherlands) Jordy Thomassen	(Senegal) Baba Diawara	(Burundi) Pacifique Niyongabire^{2} (Spain) Isaías^{1}	
Brisbane Roar	(Denmark) Thomas Kristensen	(Denmark) Tobias Mikkelsen	(France) Éric Bauthéac	(Spain) Álex López		(Brazil) Henrique^{1} (England) Jamie Young^{2} (New Zealand) Dane Ingham^{2} (Sri Lanka) Jack Hingert^{2}	(Greece) Avraam Papadopoulos^{2}
Central Coast Mariners	(England) Sam Graham	(Republic of Ireland) Stephen Mallon	(Netherlands) Tom Hiariej	(New Zealand) Michael McGlinchey	(Turkey) Jem Karacan		(Mali) Kalifa Cissé (Scotland) Ross McCormack
Melbourne City	(Belgium) Ritchie De Laet	(England) Shayon Harrison	(France) Florin Berenguer	(Netherlands) Bart Schenkeveld		(Italy) Iacopo La Rocca^{1}	(Scotland) Michael O'Halloran (Uruguay) Bruno Fornaroli
Melbourne Victory	(Germany) Georg Niedermeier	(Japan) Keisuke Honda	(New Zealand) Kosta Barbarouses	(Spain) Raúl Baena	(Sweden) Ola Toivonen	(Burundi) Elvis Kamsoba^{2} (New Zealand) Jai Ingham^{2} (New Zealand) Storm Roux^{2} (South Sudan) Kenny Athiu^{2}	
Newcastle Jets	(Brazil) Jair	(Republic of Ireland) Roy O'Donovan	(New Zealand) Matthew Ridenton	(Venezuela) Ronald Vargas		(England) Kaine Sheppard^{1} (North Macedonia) Daniel Georgievski^{2} (New Zealand) Kwabena Appiah^{2} (New Zealand) Glen Moss^{2}	
Perth Glory	(Republic of Ireland) Andy Keogh	(Spain) Diego Castro	(Spain) Juande	(Portugal) Fábio Ferreira			
Sydney FC	(England) Adam Le Fondre	(Iran) Reza Ghoochannejhad	(Netherlands) Siem de Jong	(Netherlands) Jop van der Linden	(Serbia) Miloš Ninković		
Wellington Phoenix	(England) Steven Taylor	(Republic of Ireland) Cillian Sheridan	(Poland) Michał Kopczyński	(Poland) Filip Kurto	(Spain) Mandi	(Fiji) Roy Krishna^{1}	
Western Sydney Wanderers	(Curaçao) Roly Bonevacia	(Germany) Alexander Baumjohann	(Germany) Patrick Ziegler	(Spain) Raúl Llorente	(Spain) Oriol Riera		

The following do not fill a Visa position:
^{1}Those players who were born and started their professional career abroad but have since gained Australian citizenship (and New Zealand citizenship, in the case of Wellington Phoenix);
^{2}Australian citizens (and New Zealand citizens, in the case of Wellington Phoenix) who have chosen to represent another national team;
^{3}Injury Replacement Players, or National Team Replacement Players;
^{4}Guest Players (eligible to play a maximum of fourteen games)

=== Salary cap exemptions and captains ===
Club	First Marquee	Second Marquee	Captain	Vice-Captain
Adelaide United	(Senegal) Baba Diawara	None	(Spain) Isaías	None
Brisbane Roar	(France) Éric Bauthéac	None	(Australia) Matt McKay	None
Central Coast Mariners	(Scotland) Ross McCormack (Note: McCormack transferred out of Central Coast Mariners and his marquee deal part-way through on 5 January 2019.)	(Australia) Daniel De Silva (Note: De Silva is being paid marquee wages with Central Coast Mariners paying part and Roma paying most of it, while being on loan at Sydney FC.)	(Australia) Matt Simon	None
Melbourne City	(Belgium) Ritchie de Laet	(Uruguay) Bruno Fornaroli (Note: Fornaroli was mutually released from his contract and marquee deal by Melbourne City part-way through on 26 February 2019.)	(Australia) Scott Jamieson	None
Melbourne Victory	(Japan) Keisuke Honda	(Australia) James Troisi	(Australia) Carl Valeri	(Australia) Leigh Broxham
Newcastle Jets	(Venezuela) Ronald Vargas	None	(Australia) Nigel Boogaard	(Australia) Nikolai Topor-Stanley
Perth Glory	(Spain) Diego Castro	None	(Spain) Diego Castro	None
Sydney FC	(Serbia) Miloš Ninković	(Netherlands) Siem de Jong	(Australia) Alex Brosque	(Australia) Alex Wilkinson
Wellington Phoenix	None	None	(New Zealand) Andrew Durante	None
Western Sydney Wanderers	(Spain) Oriol Riera	None	(Australia) Brendan Hamill	None

== Regular season ==
=== League table ===
Pos	Team	Pld	W	D	L	GF	GA	GD	Pts	Qualification
1	Perth Glory	27	18	6	3	56	23	+33	60	Qualification for 2020 AFC Champions League group stage and Finals series (Note: The top two teams enter the Finals series at the semi-finals, while the teams ranked third to sixth enter the Finals series at the elimination-finals.)
2	Sydney FC (C)	27	16	4	7	43	29	+14	52	Qualification for 2020 AFC Champions League group stage and Finals series
3	Melbourne Victory	27	15	5	7	50	32	+18	50	Qualification for 2020 AFC Champions League preliminary round 2 and Finals series
4	Adelaide United	27	12	8	7	37	32	+5	44	Qualification for Finals series
5	Melbourne City	27	11	7	9	39	32	+7	40	Qualification for Finals series
6	Wellington Phoenix (Note: Wellington Phoenix cannot qualify for the AFC Champions League as they are not recognised as an AFC club.)	27	11	7	9	46	43	+3	40	Qualification for Finals series
7	Newcastle Jets	27	10	5	12	40	36	+4	35	
8	Western Sydney Wanderers	27	6	6	15	42	54	−12	24	
9	Brisbane Roar	27	4	6	17	38	71	−33	18	
10	Central Coast Mariners	27	3	4	20	31	70	−39	13	

Source: A-Leagues
Rules for classification: 1) points; 2) goal difference; 3) number of goals scored.
(C) Champions

=== Results ===
Home \ Away	ADE	BRI	CCM	MCY	MVC	NEW	PER	SYD	WEL	WSW	ADE	BRI	CCM	MCY	MVC	NEW	PER	SYD	WEL	WSW
Adelaide United		2–1	2–1	0–2	2–0	1–1	0–2	1–1	0–0	2–2		4–3			1–0		0–2		3–1	1–3
Brisbane Roar	3–5		1–1	2–0	2–4	1–6	2–4	2–1	0–0	2–2					0–5			1–3	2–1	1–4
Central Coast Mariners	0–3	1–1		1–1	2–3	1–2	1–4	1–2	2–8	3–1	0–1	3–5		2–1			0–3			
Melbourne City	1–1	1–0	5–0		1–1	3–0	0–0	0–3	2–0	4–3	0–0	4–1				2–1	2–2			
Melbourne Victory	2–0	2–1	4–1	1–2		2–1	2–3	2–1	1–1	4–0			2–1	1–1		0–2	1–2		3–3	
Newcastle Jets	1–2	2–0	1–0	3–1	0–1		0–2	1–1	1–1	3–2	0–0	2–2	2–3					2–0		
Perth Glory	0–0	2–1	3–2	1–0	0–2	2–0		1–2	3–0	1–1		4–0				1–0		3–1	5–0	4–3
Sydney FC	2–1	2–1	5–2	2–0	1–2	1–0	1–0		1–3	2–0	2–0		1–1	0–2	2–1					
Wellington Phoenix	1–3	4–1	2–0	1–0	1–1	2–1	1–1	0–1		0–3			3–2	3–2		4–0		0–1		3–1
Western Sydney Wanderers	1–2	2–2	2–0	0–2	1–2	0–2	1–1	1–3	2–3				2–0	3–0	0–1	1–5		1–1		

Updated to match(es) played on 28 April 2019. Source: A-League
Legend: Blue = home team win; Yellow = draw; Red = away team win.
For upcoming matches, an "a" indicates there is an article about the rivalry between the two participants.

== Finals series ==
Elimination-finals
4	Adelaide United (a.e.t.)	1
5	Melbourne City	0
3	Melbourne Victory	3
6	Wellington Phoenix	1

Semi-finals
1	Perth Glory (p)	3 (5)
4	Adelaide United	3 (4)
2	Sydney FC	6
3	Melbourne Victory	1

Grand Final
1	Perth Glory	0 (1)
2	Sydney FC (p)	0 (4)

=== Elimination-finals ===
3 May 2019	Melbourne Victory	3–1	Wellington Phoenix	Melbourne
19:50 AEST	Niedermeier 42'; Barbarouses 53'; Toivonen 71'	Report	Krishna 64'	Stadium: AAMI Park; Attendance: 16,010; Referee: Shaun Evans

5 May 2019	Adelaide United	1–0 (a.e.t.)	Melbourne City	Adelaide
18:30 ACST	Halloran 119'	Report		Stadium: Coopers Stadium; Attendance: 13,232; Referee: Kurt Ams

=== Semi-finals ===
10 May 2019	Perth Glory	3–3 (a.e.t.) (5–4 p)	Adelaide United	Perth
18:30 AWST	Castro 29', 74'; Neville 104'	Report	Diawara 81'; Kitto 90+4'; Marrone 115'	Stadium: HBF Park; Attendance: 17,868; Referee: Alex King
	Penalties
	(penalty scored) Juande; (penalty missed) Castro; (penalty scored) Santalab; (penalty scored) Reddy; (penalty scored) Brimmer; (penalty missed) Davidson; (penalty missed) Lowry; (penalty scored) Chianese		(penalty scored) Goodwin; (penalty scored) Elsey; (penalty scored) Lia; (penalty missed) Isaías; (penalty scored) Halloran; (penalty missed) Diawara; (penalty missed) Mileusnic; (penalty missed) Konstandopoulos

12 May 2019	Sydney FC	6–1	Melbourne Victory	Sydney
19:00 AEST	Calver 3'; Brosque 43'; Broxham 45+2' (o.g.); Le Fondre 63' (pen.), 68'; Ninkovic 88'	Report	Toivonen 90+1'	Stadium: Netstrata Jubilee Stadium; Attendance: 12,141; Referee: Chris Beath

=== Grand Final ===
19 May 2019	Perth Glory	0–0 (a.e.t.) (1–4 p)	Sydney FC	Perth
16:30 AWST		Report		Stadium: Optus Stadium; Attendance: 56,371; Referee: Shaun Evans
	Penalties
	(penalty scored) Juande; (penalty missed) Keogh; (penalty missed) Santalab		(penalty scored) Le Fondre; (penalty scored) O'Neill; (penalty scored) Grant; (penalty scored) Ghoochannejhad

== Season statistics ==
=== Attendances ===
==== By club ====
These are the attendance records of each of the teams at the end of the home and away season. The table does not include finals series attendances.

As of matches played on 28 April 2019.

Team	Hosted	Average	High	Low	Total
Melbourne Victory	14	20,604	40,504	8,039	288,453
Sydney FC	13	13,566	30,588	6,261	176,357
Perth Glory	14	10,360	17,856	7,213	145,045
Brisbane Roar	13	9,632	15,129	6,084	125,222
Western Sydney Wanderers	14	9,191	21,984	5,067	128,670
Newcastle Jets	13	9,079	11,814	6,701	118,029
Adelaide United	14	9,013	12,866	7,071	126,188
Wellington Phoenix	14	8,533	23,648	4,829	119,455
Melbourne City	13	8,135	24,306	4,950	105,750
Central Coast Mariners	13	5,562	8,923	3,703	72,300
League total	135	10,411	40,504	3,703	1,405,469

==== By round ====
2018–19 A-League Attendance
Round	Total	Games	Avg. Per Game
Round 1	84,761	5	16,952
Round 2	77,986	5	15,597
Round 3	44,728	5	8,946
Round 4	49,105	5	9,821
Round 5	54,712	5	10,942
Round 6	46,789	5	9,358
Round 7	57,101	5	11,420
Round 8	50,507	5	10,101
Round 9	58,429	5	11,686
Round 10	55,700	5	11,140
Round 11	44,866	5	8,973
Round 12	41,546	5	8,309
Round 13	53,733	5	10,747
Round 14	48,849	5	9,770
Round 15	37,920	5	7,584
Round 16	57,050	5	11,410
Round 17	42,065	5	8,413
Round 18	52,669	5	10,534
Round 19	63,527	5	12,705
Round 20	57,812	5	11,562
Round 21	38,835	5	7,767
Round 22	46,329	5	9,266
Round 23	46,704	5	9,341
Round 24	40,205	5	8,041
Round 25	63,295	5	12,659
Round 26	45,431	5	9,086
Round 27	44,794	5	8,959
Elimination Final	29,242	2	14,621
Semi Final	30,009	2	15,004
Grand Final	56,371	1	56,371

=== Club membership ===
2018–19 A-League membership figures
Club	Members
Adelaide United	8,082
Brisbane Roar	11,524
Central Coast Mariners	6,843
Melbourne City	10,302
Melbourne Victory	26,478
Newcastle Jets	11,606
Perth Glory	10,460
Sydney FC	15,848
Wellington Phoenix	5,671
Western Sydney Wanderers	16,444
Total	123,258
Average	12,326

Last updated: 28 April 2019.
Source: a-league.com.au

=== Scoring ===
==== Top scorers ====
As of the end of the Regular Season, 28 April 2019

Rank	Player	Club	Goals
1	(Fiji) Roy Krishna	Wellington Phoenix	18
2	(England) Adam Le Fondre	Sydney FC	16
3	(Republic of Ireland) Andy Keogh	Perth Glory	15
4	(New Zealand) Kosta Barbarouses	Melbourne Victory	14
5	(Sweden) Ola Toivonen	Melbourne Victory	13
6	(Republic of Ireland) Roy O'Donovan	Newcastle Jets	11
6	(Australia) Adam Taggart	Brisbane Roar	11
6	(Australia) David Williams	Wellington Phoenix	11
9	(Australia) Craig Goodwin	Adelaide United	10
9	(Spain) Oriol Riera	Western Sydney Wanderers	10

==== Hat-tricks ====
Player	For	Against	Result	Date	Ref
(Australia) Alex Brosque	Sydney FC	Central Coast Mariners	5–2	4 January 2019	
(New Zealand) Kosta Barbarouses	Melbourne Victory	Brisbane Roar	0–5	15 January 2019	
(Australia) David Williams	Wellington Phoenix	Newcastle Jets	4–1	31 March 2019	
(Fiji) Roy Krishna	Wellington Phoenix	Melbourne City	3–2	21 April 2019	

==== Own goals ====
As of the end of the Regular Season, 28 April 2019

Player	Club	Against	Round
(North Macedonia) Daniel Georgievski	Newcastle Jets	Wellington Phoenix	1
(Australia) Connor O'Toole	Brisbane Roar	Perth Glory	3
(New Zealand) Tom Doyle	Wellington Phoenix	Adelaide United	5
(Australia) Tomislav Mrcela	Perth Glory	Central Coast Mariners	5
(Sweden) Ola Toivonen	Melbourne Victory	Brisbane Roar	8
(Australia) Jordan Elsey	Adelaide United	Melbourne City	8
(Greece) Avraam Papadopoulos	Brisbane Roar	Wellington Phoenix	9
(Australia) Aaron Reardon	Brisbane Roar	Perth Glory	11
(Australia) Nigel Boogaard	Newcastle Jets	Sydney FC	14
(Australia) Ben Kennedy	Central Coast Mariners	Melbourne Victory	17
(England) Sam Graham	Central Coast Mariners	Wellington Phoenix	21
(Australia) Paulo Retre	Sydney FC	Melbourne City	22
(Australia) Harrison Delbridge	Melbourne City	Brisbane Roar	24
(Australia) Vedran Janjetović	Western Sydney Wanderers	Newcastle Jets	24

==== Clean sheets ====
As of the end of the Regular Season, 28 April 2019

Rank	Player	Club	Clean sheets
1	(Australia) Liam Reddy	Perth Glory	12
2	(Australia) Eugene Galekovic	Melbourne City	8
2	(Australia) Paul Izzo	Adelaide United	8
2	(Australia) Andrew Redmayne	Sydney FC	8
5	(New Zealand) Glen Moss	Newcastle Jets	6
6	(Australia) Lawrence Thomas	Melbourne Victory	5
7	(Australia) Vedran Janjetović	Western Sydney Wanderers	4
7	(Poland) Filip Kurto	Wellington Phoenix	4
9	(England) Jamie Young	Brisbane Roar	2
10	(Australia) Matt Acton	Melbourne Victory	1
10	(Australia) James Delianov	Melbourne City	1

=== Discipline ===
During the season each club is given fair play points based on the number of cards they received in games. A yellow card is worth 1 point, a second yellow card is worth 2 points, and a red card is worth 3 points. At the annual awards night, the club with the fewest points wins the Fair Play Award.

==== Player ====
- Most yellow cards: 11
  - (New Zealand) Alex Rufer (Wellington Phoenix)
- Most red cards: 2
  - (France) Éric Bauthéac (Brisbane Roar)
  - (Australia) Kye Rowles (Central Coast Mariners)

==== Club ====
- Most yellow cards: 67
  - Wellington Phoenix
- Most red cards: 7
  - Central Coast Mariners

Fair Play Award
Club	Yellow card	Second yellow card	Red card	FP Pts
Newcastle Jets	42	1	1	47
Sydney FC	49	0	0	49
Adelaide United	41	2	2	51
Perth Glory	50	0	1	53
Melbourne Victory	53	2	0	57
Western Sydney Wanderers	57	1	1	62
Melbourne City	61	2	0	65
Wellington Phoenix	59	1	2	67
Central Coast Mariners	58	5	2	74
Brisbane Roar	61	3	3	76
League total	532	17	12	

Last updated: 28 April 2019.
Source: ultimatealeague.com

== Awards ==
=== Monthly awards ===
The A-League Goal of the Month is an award that recognises the player who is deemed to have scored the best A-League goal each month of the season. The winner is chosen by an online public vote through the A-League website.

Month	Goal of the Month		Nominee for Young Footballer of the Year		Ref.
Month	Player	Club	Player	Club	Ref.
October	(Australia) Scott Galloway	Adelaide United	—		
November	(Australia) Terry Antonis	Melbourne Victory	(Australia) Chris Ikonomidis	Perth Glory	
December	(Australia) David Williams	Wellington Phoenix	(New Zealand) Sarpreet Singh	Wellington Phoenix	
January	(Australia) Jaushua Sotirio	Western Sydney Wanderers	(Australia) Lachlan Wales	Melbourne City	
February	(France) Éric Bauthéac	Brisbane Roar	(Australia) Thomas Deng	Melbourne Victory	
March	(Australia) Dylan Wenzel-Halls	Brisbane Roar	(Australia) Keanu Baccus	Western Sydney Wanderers	
April	(France) Éric Bauthéac	Brisbane Roar	(Australia) Riley McGree	Melbourne City	
May	(Spain) Diego Castro	Perth Glory	—		

=== Annual awards ===
The NAB Young Footballer of the Year Award was awarded to the finest performance of an under-23 player from Australia or New Zealand throughout the season.

The following end of the season awards were announced at the 2018–19 Dolan Warren Awards night on 13 May 2019.

- Johnny Warren Medal – Roy Krishna, Wellington Phoenix
- NAB Young Footballer of the Year – Chris Ikonomidis, Perth Glory
- Nike Golden Boot Award – Roy Krishna, Wellington Phoenix (18 goals)
- Goalkeeper of the Year – Filip Kurto, Wellington Phoenix
- Coach of the Year – Tony Popovic, Perth Glory
- Fair Play Award – Sydney FC
- Referee of the Year – Shaun Evans
- Goal of the Year – Éric Bauthéac, Brisbane Roar (Central Coast Mariners v Brisbane Roar, 22 February 2019)

Team of the Season
Goalkeeper	(Poland) Filip Kurto (Wellington Phoenix)					
Defenders	(Australia) Rhyan Grant (Sydney FC)		(Netherlands) Bart Schenkeveld (Melbourne City)	(Australia) Shane Lowry (Perth Glory)		(Australia) Jason Davidson (Perth Glory)
Midfielders	(Spain) Diego Castro (Perth Glory)		(Australia) Neil Kilkenny (Perth Glory)		(Australia) Brandon O'Neill (Sydney FC)	
Forwards	(Australia) Chris Ikonomidis (Perth Glory)		(Fiji) Roy Krishna (Wellington Phoenix)		(Sweden) Ola Toivonen (Melbourne Victory)	
Substitutes	(Denmark) Michael Jakobsen (Adelaide United)	(Spain) Isaías (Adelaide United)	(England) Adam Le Fondre (Sydney FC)	(Serbia) Miloš Ninković (Sydney FC)	(Australia) Liam Reddy (Perth Glory)	

== See also ==
- 2018–19 Adelaide United FC season
- 2018–19 Brisbane Roar FC season
- 2018–19 Central Coast Mariners FC season
- 2018–19 Melbourne City FC season
- 2018–19 Melbourne Victory FC season
- 2018–19 Newcastle Jets FC season
- 2018–19 Perth Glory FC season
- 2018–19 Sydney FC season
- 2018–19 Wellington Phoenix FC season
- 2018–19 Western Sydney Wanderers FC season
