= 2018–19 Western Sydney Wanderers FC season =

Western Sydney Wanderers
2018–19 season
- Chairman: Paul Lederer
- Manager: Markus Babbel
- Stadium: ANZ Stadium & Spotless Stadium, Sydney
- A-League: 8th
- FFA Cup: Semi-Finals
- Top goalscorer: League: Oriol Riera (10 goals); All: Oriol Riera (13 goals)
- Highest home attendance: 21,984 vs Sydney FC; 13 April 2019
- Lowest home attendance: 5,067 vs Brisbane Roar; 10 November 2018
- Average home league attendance: 9,312
Home colours	Away colours	Third colours

The 2018–19 Western Sydney Wanderers FC season was the club's seventh season since its establishment in 2012. The club participated in the A-League for the seventh time and the FFA Cup for the fifth time.

== Players ==
=== Squad information ===
Note: Flags indicate national team as defined under FIFA eligibility rules; some limited exceptions apply. Players may hold more than one non-FIFA nationality.

No.	Pos.	Nation	Player
1	GK	AUS	Danijel Nizic
3	DF	AUS	Giancarlo Gallifuoco (Injury replacement loan)
4	DF	AUS	Josh Risdon
5	DF	AUS	Brendan Hamill (Captain)
6	MF	AUS	Kosta Grozos (Scholarship)
7	FW	AUS	Nick Fitzgerald
8	MF	AUS	Jordan O'Doherty
9	FW	ESP	Oriol Riera
10	MF	GER	Alexander Baumjohann
11	FW	AUS	Bruce Kamau
12	FW	AUS	Mitchell Duke
13	DF	AUS	Tass Mourdoukoutas
14	DF	AUS	Mathieu Cordier (Scholarship)
16	FW	AUS	Jaushua Sotirio
17	MF	AUS	Keanu Baccus

No.	Pos.	Nation	Player
18	MF	AUS	Marc Tokich
19	FW	AUS	Mark Bridge
20	GK	AUS	Vedran Janjetović
21	DF	AUS	Tarek Elrich
22	MF	AUS	Rashid Mahazi
23	FW	AUS	Lachlan Scott
24	DF	ESP	Raúl Llorente
27	FW	AUS	Kwame Yeboah
28	MF	CUW	Roly Bonevacia
32	FW	AUS	John Roberts (Scholarship)
33	DF	AUS	Tate Russell (Scholarship)
34	DF	GER	Patrick Ziegler
40	GK	AUS	Nicholas Suman (Scholarship)
49	FW	AUS	Abraham Majok

=== From youth squad ===
N	Pos.	Nat.	Name	Age	Notes
13	DF	(Australia)	Tass Mourdoukoutas	19	2 year senior contract
33	DF	(Australia)	Tate Russell	18	2 year scholarship contract
14	DF	(Australia)	Mathieu Cordier	19	0.5 year scholarship contract, followed by promotion to senior contract
41	MF	(Australia)	Fabian Monge	17	2 year scholarship contract

=== Transfers in ===
No.	Position	Player	Transferred from	Type/fee	Contract length	Date	Ref
7	FW	Nick Fitzgerald	Melbourne City	Free transfer	3 years	3 May 2018	
11	FW	Bruce Kamau	Melbourne City	Free transfer	2 years	3 May 2018	
12	DF	Ruon Tongyik	Melbourne City	Free transfer	2 years	3 May 2018	
21	DF	Tarek Elrich	Adelaide United	Free transfer	2 years	9 May 2018	
8	MF	Jordan O'Doherty		Free transfer	3 years	6 June 2018	
1	GK	Danijel Nizic		Free transfer	2 years	4 July 2018	
34	DF	(Germany) Patrick Ziegler	(Germany) Kaiserslautern	Free transfer	3 years	26 July 2018	
10	MF	(Germany) Alexander Baumjohann	(Brazil) Clube Vitória	Free transfer	1 year	9 August 2018	
22	DF	Rashid Mahazi	(Australia) Moreland Zebras	Free transfer	1 year	4 October 2018	
27	FW	Kwame Yeboah	(Germany) Fortuna Köln	Free transfer	2.5 years	31 December 2018	
12	FW	Mitchell Duke		Free transfer	1.5 years	25 January 2019	
3	DF	Giancarlo Gallifuoco		Injury replacement loan	1 year	5 March 2019	

=== Transfers out ===
No.	Position	Player	Transferred to	Type/fee	Date	Ref
10	MF	(Spain) Álvaro Cejudo		End of contract	27 April 2018	
3	DF	Jack Clisby		End of contract	27 April 2018	
33	DF	Michael Thwaite		End of contract	27 April 2018	
22	DF	Jonathan Aspropotamitis	Central Coast Mariners	Free transfer	14 May 2018	
11	FW	Brendon Santalab	Perth Glory	Free transfer	19 June 2018	
7	MF	Steven Lustica		End of contract	30 June 2018	
18	MF	Chris Ikonomidis	(Italy) Lazio	Loan return	30 June 2018	
15	MF	Kearyn Baccus	Melbourne City	Free transfer	12 October 2018	
12	DF	Ruon Tongyik		Free transfer	2 January 2019	
23	FW	Lachlan Scott		Mutual contract termination	22 February 2019	

=== Contract extensions ===
No.	Name	Position	Duration	Date	Notes
24	(Spain) Raúl Llorente	Left back	1 year	18 June 2018	
40	Nicholas Suman	Goalkeeper	2 years	4 July 2018	Extension of scholarship contract
17	Keanu Baccus	Defensive midfielder	3 years	14 February 2019	

== Squad statistics ==
=== Appearances and goals ===
N	Pos.	Nat.	Name	Total					A-League					FFA Cup
N	Pos.	Nat.	Name	Apps	Goals	Yellow card	Second yellow card	Red card	Apps	Goals	Yellow card	Second yellow card	Red card	Apps	Goals	Yellow card	Second yellow card	Red card
1	GK	(Australia)	Danijel Nizic	5	0	0	0	0	0+1	0	0	0	0	4+0	0	0	0	0
3	DF	(Australia)	Giancarlo Gallifuoco	4	0	1	0	0	2+2	0	1	0	0	0+0	0	0	0	0
4	DF	(Australia)	Josh Risdon	13	0	3	0	0	10+0	0	3	0	0	3+0	0	0	0	0
5	DF	(Australia)	Brendan Hamill	26	2	5	0	0	22+0	1	5	0	0	4+0	1	0	0	0
6	MF	(Australia)	Kosta Grozos†	2	0	0	0	0	0+0	0	0	0	0	2+0	0	0	0	0
7	FW	(Australia)	Nick Fitzgerald	15	0	0	0	0	3+9	0	0	0	0	1+2	0	0	0	0
8	MF	(Australia)	Jordan O'Doherty	17	1	2	0	0	16+1	1	2	0	0	0+0	0	0	0	0
9	FW	(Spain)	Oriol Riera	26	13	4	0	0	21+1	10	4	0	0	4+0	3	0	0	0
10	MF	(Germany)	Alexander Baumjohann	20	3	2	0	0	14+3	2	1	0	0	3+0	1	1	0	0
11	FW	(Australia)	Bruce Kamau	25	1	2	0	0	20+4	1	2	0	0	1+0	0	0	0	0
12	FW	(Australia)	Mitchell Duke	8	4	0	0	0	4+4	4	0	0	0	0+0	0	0	0	0
13	DF	(Australia)	Tass Mourdoukoutas	10	1	2	0	0	7+2	1	2	0	0	1+0	0	0	0	0
14	DF	(Australia)	Mathieu Cordier†	2	0	0	0	0	1+0	0	0	0	0	0+1	0	0	0	0
16	FW	(Australia)	Jaushua Sotirio	15	3	3	0	0	7+6	3	2	0	0	2+0	0	1	0	0
17	MF	(Australia)	Keanu Baccus	23	3	7	1	0	20+1	3	7	1	0	2+0	0	0	0	0
18	MF	(Australia)	Marc Tokich	9	0	0	0	0	2+4	0	0	0	0	2+1	0	0	0	0
19	FW	(Australia)	Mark Bridge	2	0	1	0	0	0+2	0	1	0	0	0+0	0	0	0	0
20	GK	(Australia)	Vedran Janjetović	20	0	1	0	1	20+0	0	1	0	1	0+0	0	0	0	0
21	DF	(Australia)	Tarek Elrich	28	2	4	0	0	24+0	2	4	0	0	2+2	0	0	0	0
22	MF	(Australia)	Rashid Mahazi	15	1	5	0	0	7+7	1	5	0	0	1+0	0	0	0	0
24	DF	(Spain)	Raúl Llorente	17	0	3	0	0	11+2	0	2	0	0	4+0	0	1	0	0
27	FW	(Australia)	Kwame Yeboah	10	2	2	0	0	7+3	2	2	0	0	0+0	0	0	0	0
28	MF	(Curaçao)	Roly Bonevacia	24	9	5	0	0	18+2	7	4	0	0	4+0	2	1	0	0
32	FW	(Australia)	John Roberts†	0	0	0	0	0	0+0	0	0	0	0	0+0	0	0	0	0
33	DF	(Australia)	Tate Russell†	11	0	2	0	0	10+1	0	2	0	0	0+0	0	0	0	0
34	DF	(Germany)	Patrick Ziegler	8	0	0	0	0	6+0	0	0	0	0	2+0	0	0	0	0
40	GK	(Australia)	Nicholas Suman†	4	0	0	0	0	4+0	0	0	0	0	0+0	0	0	0	0
41	MF	(Australia)	Fabian Monge†	0	0	0	0	0	0+0	0	0	0	0	0+0	0	0	0	0
42	MF	(Australia)	Andrea Agamemnonos†	0	0	0	0	0	0+0	0	0	0	0	0+0	0	0	0	0
43	DF	(Australia)	Daniel Wilmering†	1	0	0	0	0	0+1	0	0	0	0	0+0	0	0	0	0
49	FW	(Australia)	Abraham Majok	16	2	1	0	0	6+9	2	0	0	0	0+1	0	1	0	0
50	GK	(Australia)	Jack Greenwood†	3	0	1	0	0	2+0	0	0	0	0	0+1	0	1	0	0
Players no longer at the club
12	DF	(Australia)	Ruon Tongyik	2	0	0	0	0	2+0	0	0	0	0	0+0	0	0	0	0
23	FW	(Australia)	Lachlan Scott	0	0	0	0	0	0+0	0	0	0	0	0+0	0	0	0	0

- Last updated: 6 April 2019
- Source: au.soccerway.com
- (yellow card) = Number of bookings; (second yellow card) = Number of sending offs after a second yellow card; (red card) = Number of sending offs by a direct red card.

† = Scholarship or NPL/NYL-listed player

== Pre-season and friendlies ==
26 July 2018	Western Sydney Wanderers (Australia)	2–0	(Australia) Blacktown City	Sydney
	Bonevacia; Hamill	Report		Stadium: Valentine Sports Park; Attendance: 0 (behind closed doors)

1 August 2018	Edgeworth FC (Australia)	1–3	(Australia) Western Sydney Wanderers	Lisarow
	Goal	Report	Bonevacia; Kamau; Majok	Stadium: Pluim Park; Attendance: 0 (behind closed doors)

8 September 2018	Melbourne Victory (Australia)	1–1	(Australia) Western Sydney Wanderers	Ballarat
14:30 AEST	Troisi 18'	Report	Bonevacia 79'	Stadium: Morshead Park

13 September 2018	Central Coast Mariners (Australia)	3–0	(Australia) Western Sydney Wanderers	Lisarow
	Simon 1'; Hiariej 15'; McGlinchey 16'	Report		Stadium: Pluim Park; Attendance: 0 (behind closed doors)

23 September 2018	Western Sydney Wanderers (Australia)	1–0	(New Zealand) Wellington Phoenix	Sydney
12:00 AEST	Fitzgerald 20'	Report		Stadium: Marconi Stadium; Attendance: 3,000

29 September 2018	Newcastle Jets (Australia)	4–0	(Australia) Western Sydney Wanderers	Maitland
12:00 AEST	D. Petratos 7'; Boogaard 16'; Vargas 19'; Sheppard 89'	Report		Stadium: No.1 Sportsground; Attendance: 1,600

12 October 2018	Melbourne City (Australia)	4–1	(Australia) Western Sydney Wanderers	Shepparton
19:30	Delbridge 21'; Berenguer 25'; Vidošić 69' (pen.); McGree 90+1'	Report	Majok 42'	Stadium: McEwen Reserve; Referee: Shaun Evans

17 February 2019	Western Sydney Wanderers (Australia)	Cancelled	(China) Guangzhou R&F	Sydney
AEST		Source		Stadium: Lily's Football Centre

== Competitions ==
=== Overall ===
Competition	Started round	Final position / round	First match	Last match
A-League	—	8th	21 October 2018	27 April 2019
FFA Cup	Round of 32	Semi-Finals	7 August 2018	6 October 2018

=== A-League ===
==== League table ====
Pos	Team	Pld	W	D	L	GF	GA	GD	Pts	Qualification
1	Perth Glory	27	18	6	3	56	23	+33	60	Qualification for 2020 AFC Champions League group stage and Finals series (Note: The top two teams enter the Finals series at the semi-finals, while the teams ranked third to sixth enter the Finals series at the elimination-finals.)
2	Sydney FC (C)	27	16	4	7	43	29	+14	52	Qualification for 2020 AFC Champions League group stage and Finals series
3	Melbourne Victory	27	15	5	7	50	32	+18	50	Qualification for 2020 AFC Champions League preliminary round 2 and Finals series
4	Adelaide United	27	12	8	7	37	32	+5	44	Qualification for Finals series
5	Melbourne City	27	11	7	9	39	32	+7	40	Qualification for Finals series
6	Wellington Phoenix (Note: Wellington Phoenix cannot qualify for the AFC Champions League as they are not recognised as an AFC club.)	27	11	7	9	46	43	+3	40	Qualification for Finals series
7	Newcastle Jets	27	10	5	12	40	36	+4	35	
8	Western Sydney Wanderers	27	6	6	15	42	54	−12	24	
9	Brisbane Roar	27	4	6	17	38	71	−33	18	
10	Central Coast Mariners	27	3	4	20	31	70	−39	13	

Source: A-Leagues
Rules for classification: 1) points; 2) goal difference; 3) number of goals scored.
(C) Champions

==== Results summary ====
Overall								Home						Away					
Pld	W	D	L	GF	GA	GD	Pts	W	D	L	GF	GA	GD	W	D	L	GF	GA	GD
27	6	6	15	42	54	−12	24	3	3	8	17	24	−7	3	3	7	25	30	−5

Last updated: 6 April 2019.

==== Results by round ====
Round	1	2	3	4	5	6	7	8	9	10	11	12	13	14	15	16	17	18	19	20	21	22	23	24	25	26	27
Ground	A	A	A	H	H	A	H	H	A	H	H	H	A	H	A	A	H	H	A	H	A	A	H	A	H	A	H
Result	D	L	W	D	L	L	W	L	D	L	L	L	L	L	L	D	L	W	W	D	W	L	W	L	D	L	L
Position	8	9	4	5	8	8	6	8	8	8	8	8	8	8	8	8	8	8	8	8	8	8	8	8	8	8	8

Updated to match(es) played on 6 April 2019. Source: ultimatealeague.com
A = Away; H = Home; W = Win; D = Draw; L = Loss

==== Matches ====
Win Draw Loss

21 October 2018 1	Perth Glory	1–1	Western Sydney Wanderers	Perth
16:00 AWST	Keogh 26'	Report	Bonevacia 65'	Stadium: nib Stadium; Attendance: 10,206; Referee: Peter Green

27 October 2018 2	Sydney FC	2–0	Western Sydney Wanderers	Sydney
19:50 AEDT	Le Fondre 4'; Brosque 53'	Report		Stadium: Sydney Cricket Ground; Attendance: 30,588; Referee: Chris Beath

3 November 2018 3	Wellington Phoenix	0–3	Western Sydney Wanderers	Wellington
19:35 NZDT		Report	Baumjohann 11'; Riera 55' (pen.); O'Doherty 92'	Stadium: Westpac Stadium; Attendance: 5,339; Referee: Jarred Gillett

10 November 2018 4	Western Sydney Wanderers	2–2	Brisbane Roar	Mudgee
17:35	Riera 11', 17'	Report	López 37'; Taggart 48' (pen.)	Stadium: Glen Willow Sporting Field; Attendance: 5,067; Referee: Jonathan Barreiro

23 November 2018 5	Western Sydney Wanderers	0–2	Newcastle Jets	Sydney
19:50 AEST		Report	Hoffman 25'; Vargas 90+4'	Stadium: Spotless Stadium; Attendance: 10,458; Referee: Jumpei Iida (Japan)

1 December 2018 6	Melbourne Victory	4–0	Western Sydney Wanderers	Melbourne
19:50 AEDT	Honda 11'; Baena 31'; Barbarouses 39' (pen.); Antonis 89'	Report		Stadium: Marvel Stadium; Attendance: 19,556; Referee: Chris Beath

7 December 2018 7	Western Sydney Wanderers	2–0	Central Coast Mariners	Sydney
19:50 AEDT	Baccus 45+3'; Sotirio 68'	Report		Stadium: Spotless Stadium; Attendance: 8,163; Referee: Jarred Gillett

15 December 2018 8	Western Sydney Wanderers	1–3	Sydney FC	Sydney
19:50 AEDT	Riera 23'	Report	Brosque 45+1'; de Jong 57'; Tratt 81'	Stadium: ANZ Stadium; Attendance: 18,043; Referee: Jarred Gillett

26 December 2018 9	Adelaide United	2–2	Western Sydney Wanderers	Adelaide
19:20 ACDT	Mileusnic 48', 55'	Report	Riera 45+1'; Kamau 61'	Stadium: Coopers Stadium; Attendance: 8,003; Referee: Peter Green

1 January 2019 10	Western Sydney Wanderers	0–2	Melbourne City	Sydney
19:50 AEDT		Report	Wales 35'; de Laet 37'	Stadium: ANZ Stadium; Attendance: 8,365; Referee: Adam Kersey

5 January 2019 11	Western Sydney Wanderers	1–2	Melbourne Victory	Sydney
19:50 AEDT	Baumjohann 74' (pen.)	Report	Toivonen 45', 86'	Stadium: ANZ Stadium; Attendance: 7,062; Referee: Jarred Gillett

8 January 2019 12	Western Sydney Wanderers	2–3	Wellington Phoenix	Sydney
19:50 AEDT	Hamill 42'; Baccus 84'	Report	Fenton 36'; Krishna 82', 89'	Stadium: ANZ Stadium; Attendance: 7,288; Referee: Jonathan Barreiro

13 January 2019 13	Perth Glory	4–3	Western Sydney Wanderers	Perth
17:00 AWST	Castro 70'; Franjic 79'; Keogh 82'; Juande 86' (pen.)	Report	Yeboah 39'; Bonevacia 67'; Majok 77'	Stadium: HBF Park; Attendance: 8,945; Referee: Kurt Ams

18 January 2019 14	Western Sydney Wanderers	1–2	Adelaide United	Sydney
19:50 AEDT	Bonevacia 49'	Report	Lia 8'; Goodwin 66'	Stadium: ANZ Stadium; Attendance: 7,104; Referee: Alex King

22 January 2019 15	Melbourne City	4–3	Western Sydney Wanderers	Melbourne
19:50 AEDT	de Laet 1', 84'; Brattan 38'; Schenkeveld 90+4'	Report	Bonevacia 28' (pen.); Mourdoukoutas 49'; Sotirio 54'	Stadium: AAMI Park; Attendance: 5,149; Referee: Stephen Lucas

25 January 2019 16	Brisbane Roar	2–2	Western Sydney Wanderers	Brisbane
18:50 AEST	Mikkelsen 90+2'; Taggart 90+6'	Report	Bonevacia 18'; Yeboah 42'	Stadium: Suncorp Stadium; Attendance: 8,053; Referee: Adam Fielding

1 February 2019 17	Western Sydney Wanderers	1–5	Newcastle Jets	Sydney
19:50 AEST	Duke 69'	Report	Petratos 18'; Hoffman 22'; O'Donovan 45+2', 59' (pen.); Ridenton 49'	Stadium: ANZ Stadium; Attendance: 7,594; Referee: Peter Green

9 February 2019 18	Western Sydney Wanderers	2–0	Central Coast Mariners	Sydney
17:35 AEDT	Elrich 45'; Sotirio 77'	Report		Stadium: Spotless Stadium; Attendance: 5,364; Referee: Shaun Evans

16 February 2019 19	Adelaide United	1–3	Western Sydney Wanderers	Adelaide
19:20 ACDT	Kitto 44'	Report	Riera 12'; Bonevacia 54'; Majok 71'	Stadium: Coopers Stadium; Attendance: 8,880; Referee: Daniel Elder

24 February 2019 20	Western Sydney Wanderers	1–1	Perth Glory	Sydney
19:00 AEDT	Elrich 90+5'	Report	Ikonomidis 23'	Stadium: Spotless Stadium; Attendance: 7,181; Referee: Jonathan Barreiro

8 March 2019 21	Brisbane Roar	1–4	Western Sydney Wanderers	Brisbane
18:50 AEST	Dylan Wenzel-Halls 7'	Report	Duke 15'; Riera 35', 38'; Bonevacia 90+2'	Stadium: Suncorp Stadium; Attendance: 8,130; Referee: Jarred Gillett

17 March 2019 22	Wellington Phoenix	3–1	Western Sydney Wanderers	Wellington
19:00 NZDT	Krishna 12'; Mandi 23'; Williams 33'	Report	Duke 86'	Stadium: Westpac Stadium; Attendance: 7,685; Referee: Alex King

30 March 2019 23	Western Sydney Wanderers	3–0	Melbourne City	Sydney
19:50 AEDT	Riera 35' (pen.), 84'; Duke 53'	Report		Stadium: ANZ Stadium; Attendance: 7,078; Referee: Daniel Elder

6 April 2019 24	Newcastle Jets	3–2	Western Sydney Wanderers	Newcastle
17:35 AEST	O'Donovan 63'; Janjetović 70' (o.g.); Thurgate 82'	Report	Mahazi 43'; Baccus 74'	Stadium: McDonald Jones Stadium; Attendance: 8,756; Referee: Adam Fielding

13 April 2019 25	Western Sydney Wanderers	1–1	Sydney FC	Sydney
19:50 AEST	Baumjohann 57'	Report	Brosque 7'	Stadium: ANZ Stadium; Attendance: 21,984; Referee: Shaun Evans

20 April 2019 26	Central Coast Mariners	3–1	Western Sydney Wanderers	Gosford
19:50 AEST	Simon 34', 52' (pen.); Rowles 56'	Report	Bridge 67' (pen.)	Stadium: Central Coast Stadium; Attendance: 5,059; Referee: Adam Kersey

27 April 2019 27	Western Sydney Wanderers	0–1	Melbourne Victory	Sydney
19:50 AEDT		Report	Toivonen 22'	Stadium: ANZ Stadium; Attendance: 7,919; Referee: Chris Beath

=== FFA Cup ===
7 August 2018 Round of 32	Hellenic Athletic (Northern Territory)	3–4	(New South Wales) Western Sydney Wanderers	Darwin
20:00 ACST	Smith 39'; Maskey 55', 73'	Report	Smith 8' (o.g.); Riera 10' (pen.), 69'; Bonevacia 90+2'	Stadium: Darwin Football Stadium; Attendance: 3,000; Referee: Kurt Ams

29 August 2018 Round of 16	Bonnyrigg White Eagles (New South Wales)	1–2	(New South Wales) Western Sydney Wanderers	Sydney
19:30 AEST	Diaz 65'	Report	Baumjohann 12'; Hamill 74'	Stadium: Marconi Stadium; Attendance: 5,137; Referee: Stephen Lucas

19 September 2018 Quarter-finals	Melbourne City (Victoria (state))	1–2	(New South Wales) Western Sydney Wanderers	Melbourne
19:30 AEST	McGree 53'	Report	Riera 33'; Bonevacia 42'	Stadium: AAMI Park; Attendance: 1,800; Referee: Daniel Elder

6 October 2018 Semi-finals	Western Sydney Wanderers (New South Wales)	0–3	(New South Wales) Sydney FC	Penrith
19:30 AEDT		Report	Buhagiar 49'; de Jong 64'; Le Fondre 75' (pen.)	Stadium: Penrith Stadium; Attendance: 14,436; Referee: Daniel Elder
