= Marquee player (A-League Men) =

Category of players in Australian soccer

A marquee player is a player whose wage is paid outside the A-League Men salary cap, with an unlimited salary. Furthermore, there are designated players since the 2021–22 A-League Men season, who are players whose wage is paid outside the salary cap, but have to be in the $300,000 to $600,000 range.

== Current marquees ==
As of 5 June 2025

Player	Nationality	Current club	Season signed as marquee
Juan Mata	Spain	Melbourne Victory	2024–25

Notes

- Table indicates when players signed a marquee contract with their current club, not necessarily their first year in the A-League Men or with the club.

== Club marquee history ==
As of 17 September 2024

Notes

- The below list indicates players who have had their contract assigned as a marquee contract during their time in the A-League Men. Players may have not always have had a marquee contract, or have later had their contract negotiated below a marquee contract. Their listed "Years as marquee" indicates what seasons they were active as a marquee for that club only. Players in **bold** are currently signed to a marquee contract by their club.

=== Adelaide United ===
Player	Nationality	Years as marquee	Reference
Paul Agostino	Australia	2007–09	
Marcelo Carrusca	Argentina	2014–17	
Baba Diawara	Senegal	2018–19	
Eugene Galekovic	Australia	2014–17	
Qu Shengqing	China	2005–07	
Sergio van Dijk	Indonesia	2010–12	
Dario Vidosic	Australia	2011–13	

=== Brisbane Roar ===
Player	Nationality	Years as marquee	Reference
Éric Bauthéac	France	2018–19	
Thomas Broich	Germany	2012–17	
Brett Holman	Australia	2017–18	
Massimo Maccarone	Italy	2017–18	
Matt McKay	Australia	2013–17	
Craig Moore	Australia	2007–09	
Tommy Oar	Australia	2017	

=== Central Coast Mariners ===
Player	Nationality	Years as marquee	Reference
Daniel De Silva	Australia	2017–21	
Luis García	Spain	2016	
Ross McCormack	Scotland	2018–19	
Tony Vidmar	Australia	2006–08	

=== Gold Coast United ===
Player	Nationality	Years as marquee	Reference
Jason Culina	Australia	2009–11	

=== Macarthur FC ===
Player	Nationality	Years as marquee	Reference
Mark Milligan	Australia	2020–21	

=== Melbourne City ===
Player	Nationality	Years as marquee	Reference
Marcin Budziński	Poland	2017–18	
Tim Cahill	Australia	2016–17	
Nicolás Colazo	Argentina	2016–17	
Ritchie De Laet	Belgium	2018–19	
Orlando Engelaar	Netherlands	2013–14	
Fred	Brazil	2011–13	
Bruno Fornaroli	Uruguay	2016–19	
Joshua Kennedy	Australia	2015	
Robert Koren	Slovenia	2014–16	
Jamie Maclaren	Australia	2019–24	
Aaron Mooy	Australia	2015–16	
Gerald Sibon	Netherlands	2010–11	
Josip Skoko	Australia	2010–11	
David Williams	Australia	2013–14	

=== Melbourne Victory ===
Player	Nationality	Years as marquee	Reference
Besart Berisha	Kosovo	2014–18	
Oliver Bozanic	Australia	2015–17	
Pablo Contreras	Chile	2013–14	
Marcos Flores	Argentina	2012–13	
Keisuke Honda	Japan	2018–19	
Chris Ikonomidis	Australia	2021–24	
Harry Kewell	Australia	2011–12	
Robbie Kruse	Australia	2019–21	
**Juan Mata**	Spain	2025–	
Mark Milligan	Australia	2014–15; 2017–18	
Nani	Portugal	2022–23	
Ricardinho	Brazil	2010–11	
Marco Rojas	New Zealand	2021–22	
Archie Thompson	Australia	2005–14	
Ola Toivonen	Sweden	2019–20	
James Troisi	Australia	2018–19	

=== New Zealand Knights ===
Player	Nationality	Years as marquee	Reference
Scot Gemmill	Scotland	2006–07	
Li Yan	China	2006–07	

=== Newcastle Jets ===
Player	Nationality	Years as marquee	Reference
Michael Bridges	England	2010–11	
Emile Heskey	England	2012–14	
Mário Jardel	Brazil	2007–08	
Paul Okon	Australia	2006–07	
Ronald Vargas	Venezuela	2017–19	
Fabio Vignaroli	Italy	2009–10	
Ned Zelic	Australia	2005–06	
Edmundo Zura	Ecuador	2008	

=== North Queensland Fury ===
Player	Nationality	Years as marquee	Reference
Robbie Fowler	England	2009–10	

=== Perth Glory ===
Player	Nationality	Years as marquee	Reference
Diego Castro	Spain	2015–21	
Brian Deane	England	2005	
Bruno Fornaroli	Australia	2019–22	
Robbie Fowler	England	2010–11	
William Gallas	France	2013–14	
Stan Lazaridis	Australia	2006–08	
Nebojša Marinković	Serbia	2014–15	
Shane Smeltz	New Zealand	2011–14	
Mile Sterjovski	Australia	2009–12	
Daniel Sturridge	England	2021–22	
Michael Thwaite	Australia	2014–16	

=== Sydney FC ===
Player	Nationality	Years as marquee	Reference
John Aloisi	Australia	2008–10	
Bobô	Brazil	2016–18	
Alex Brosque	Australia	2014–16	
Nick Carle	Australia	2010–12	
**Douglas Costa**	Brazil	2024–	
Siem de Jong	Netherlands	2018–19	
Alessandro Del Piero	Italy	2012–14	
Brett Emerton	Australia	2011–14	
Filip Hološko	Slovakia	2015–17	
Marc Janko	Austria	2014–15	
Juninho	Brazil	2007–08	
Adam Le Fondre	England	2019–20	
Miloš Ninković	Serbia	2017–19	
Dwight Yorke	Trinidad and Tobago	2005–06	

=== Wellington Phoenix ===
Player	Nationality	Years as marquee	Reference
Kosta Barbarouses	New Zealand	2016–17	
Ahmad Elrich	Australia	2007–08	
Guilherme Finkler	Brazil	2016–17	
Tomer Hemed	Israel	2020–21	
Gary Hooper	England	2019–20	
Jade North	Australia	2010–11	

=== Western Sydney Wanderers ===
Player	Nationality	Years as marquee	Reference
Álvaro Cejudo	Spain	2017–18	
Nicolás Martínez	Argentina	2016–17	
Juan Mata	Spain	2024–25	
Alexander Meier	Germany	2019–20	
Shinji Ono	Japan	2012–14	
Federico Piovaccari	Italy	2015–16	
Oriol Riera	Spain	2017–19	
Matthew Spiranovic	Australia	2014–15	
Dario Vidosic	Australia	2015–16	

=== Western United ===
Player	Nationality	Years as marquee	Reference
Alessandro Diamanti	Italy	2019–23	
Panagiotis Kone	Greece	2019–20	

== Marquees by nationality ==
Number	Country	Players
35	Australia	John Aloisi, Paul Agostino, Oliver Bozanic, Alex Brosque, Tim Cahill, Nick Carle, Jason Culina, Daniel De Silva, Ahmad Elrich, Brett Emerton, Eugene Galekovic, Brett Holman, Chris Ikonomidis, Joshua Kennedy, Harry Kewell, Robbie Kruse, Stan Lazaridis, Jamie Maclaren, Matt McKay, Mark Milligan, Craig Moore, Aaron Mooy, Jade North, Tommy Oar, Paul Okon, Josip Skoko, Matthew Spiranovic, Mile Sterjovski, Archie Thompson, Michael Thwaite, James Troisi, Tony Vidmar, Dario Vidosic, David Williams, Ned Zelic
7	Brazil	Bobô, Douglas Costa, Guilherme Finkler, Fred, Mário Jardel, Juninho, Ricardinho
6	England	Michael Bridges, Brian Deane, Robbie Fowler, Emile Heskey, Gary Hooper, Daniel Sturridge
5	Italy	Alessandro Del Piero, Alessandro Diamanti, Massimo Maccarone, Federico Piovaccari, Fabio Vignaroli
5	Spain	Álvaro Cejudo, Diego Castro, Luis García, Juan Mata, Oriol Riera
4	Argentina	Marcelo Carrusca, Nicolás Colazo, Marcos Flores, Nicolás Martínez
3	New Zealand	Kosta Barbarouses, Shane Smeltz, Marco Rojas
3	Netherlands	Siem de Jong, Orlando Engelaar, Gerald Sibon
2	China	Li Yan, Qu Shengqing
2	France	Éric Bauthéac, William Gallas
2	Germany	Thomas Broich, Alexander Meier
2	Japan	Keisuke Honda, Shinji Ono
2	Scotland	Ross McCormack, Scot Gemmill
2	Serbia	Nebojša Marinković, Miloš Ninković
1	Austria	Marc Janko
1	Belgium	Ritchie De Laet
1	Chile	Pablo Contreras
1	Ecuador	Edmundo Zura
1	Greece	Panagiotis Kone
1	Indonesia	Sergio van Dijk
1	Israel	Tomer Hemed
1	Kosovo	Besart Berisha
1	Poland	Marcin Budziński
1	Portugal	Nani
1	Senegal	Baba Diawara
1	Slovakia	Filip Hološko
1	Slovenia	Robert Koren
1	Sweden	Ola Toivonen
1	Trinidad and Tobago	Dwight Yorke
1	Uruguay	Bruno Fornaroli
1	Venezuela	Ronald Vargas

== See also ==
- Marquee player
- A-League Men#Squad formation and salary cap
