= A-League Men Goal of the Month =

The A-League Men Goal of the Month is an association football award that recognises the player who is deemed to have scored the best A-League Men goal each month of the season. The winner is chosen by a combination of an online public vote in the official A-League website.

As of March 2025, Newcastle Jets player Eli Adams won the latest A-League Men Goal of the Month award.

== Winners ==
As of March 2025 award

Key
Italics	Home team

Month	Year	Nationality	Player	Team	Score	Opponents	Date	Ref.
2017–18 A-League
October	2017	Fiji	Roy Krishna	Wellington Phoenix	2–0	Brisbane Roar	28 October 2017	
November	2017	Germany	Daniel Adlung	Adelaide United	1–1	Central Coast Mariners	16 November 2017	
December	2017	Australia	John Koutroumbis	Newcastle Jets	1–0	Western Sydney Wanderers	22 December 2017	
January	2018	Serbia	Miloš Ninković	Sydney FC	1–1	Newcastle Jets	3 January 2018	
February	2018	Australia	Andrew Nabbout	Newcastle Jets	2–2	Western Sydney Wanderers	16 February 2018	
March	2018	Denmark	Johan Absalonsen	Adelaide United	4–1	Newcastle Jets	23 March 2018	
2018–19 A-League
October	2018	Australia	Scott Galloway	Adelaide United	1–0	Sydney FC	19 October 2018	
November	2018	Australia	Terry Antonis	Melbourne Victory	1–0	Newcastle Jets	3 November 2018	
December	2018	Australia	David Williams	Wellington Phoenix	1–0	Melbourne Victory	28 December 2018	
January	2019	Australia	Jaushua Sotirio	Western Sydney Wanderers	3–2	Melbourne City	22 January 2019	
February	2019	France	Éric Bauthéac	Brisbane Roar	1–0	Central Coast Mariners	22 February 2019	
March	2019	Australia	Dylan Wenzel-Halls	Brisbane Roar	1–0	Western Sydney Wanderers	8 March 2019	
April	2019	France	Éric Bauthéac (2)	Brisbane Roar	3–2	Adelaide United	25 April 2019	
May	2019	Spain	Diego Castro	Perth Glory	1–0	Adelaide United	10 May 2019	
2021–22 A-League Men
November	2021	Australia	Andrew Nabbout (2)	Melbourne City	2–0	Adelaide United	27 November 2021	
January	2022	Australia	Nicholas D'Agostino	Melbourne Victory	1–0	Adelaide United	8 January 2022	
April	2022	Australia	Nestory Irankunda	Adelaide United	2–0	Perth Glory	24 April 2022	
2022–23 A-League Men
October	2022	Australia	Giordano Colli	Perth Glory	1–2	Adelaide United	30 October 2022	
December	2022	Australia	Carlo Armiento	Brisbane Roar	1–1	Western Sydney Wanderers	23 December 2022	
January	2023	Italy	Alessandro Diamanti	Western United	1–0	Sydney FC	21 January 2023	
February	2023	Australia	Nestory Irankunda (2)	Adelaide United	1–1	Melbourne Victory	26 February 2023	
March	2023	Australia	Calem Nieuwenhof	Western Sydney Wanderers	3–0	Sydney FC	18 March 2023	
April	2023	Brazil	Marco Túlio	Central Coast Mariners	3–0	Adelaide United	29 April 2023	
2023–24 A-League Men
October/November	2023	Australia	Nestory Irankunda (3)	Adelaide United	1–0	Melbourne City	29 October 2023	
December	2023	Australia	Bruno Fornaroli	Melbourne Victory	1–1	Central Coast Mariners	3 December 2023	
January	2024	Australia	Aleksandar Šušnjar	Perth Glory	2–2	Wellington Phoenix	14 January 2024	
February	2024	Colombia	Ángel Torres	Central Coast Mariners	2–0	Adelaide United	3 February 2024	
March	2024	Australia	Terry Antonis (2)	Melbourne City	7–0	Western Sydney Wanderers	12 March 2024	
April	2024	Australia	Nestory Irankunda (4)	Adelaide United	1–0	Macarthur FC	12 April 2024	
2024–25 A-League Men
October/November	2024	Australia	Ariath Piol	Macarthur FC	1–0	Sydney FC	9 November 2024	
December	2024	New Zealand	Kosta Barbarouses	Wellington Phoenix	1–2	Auckland FC	7 December 2024	
January	2025	Australia	Jordan Lauton	Western United	3–2	Perth Glory	3 January 2025	
February	2025	Uruguay	Guillermo May	Auckland FC	2–0	Western United	15 February 2025	
March	2025	Australia	Eli Adams	Newcastle Jets	1–0	Auckland FC	9 March 2025	
April/May	2025	Australia	Marlee Francois	Auckland FC	1–0	Perth Glory	27 April 2025	
2025–26 A-League Men
October/November	2025	Australia	Alexander Badolato	Newcastle Jets	1–0	Central Coast Mariners	19 October 2025	
December	2025	Australia	Eli Adams (2)	Newcastle Jets	1–1	Macarthur FC	26 December 2025	
January	2026	New Zealand	Lachlan Bayliss	Newcastle Jets	1–0	Wellington Phoenix	23 January 2026	
February	2026	Australia	Ali Auglah	Central Coast Mariners	1–0	Melbourne Victory	1 February 2026	
March	2026	Japan	Kota Mizunuma	Newcastle Jets FC	1–0	Sydney FC	22 March 2026	
April	2026	Costa Rica	Youstin Salas	Brisbane Roar	2–3	Melbourne City	18 April 2026	

1. The score at the time of the goal. Player's team's score listed first.

== Multiple winners ==
The following table lists the number of awards won by players who have won at least two Goal of the Month awards.

Players in bold are still active in the A-League Men.

As of April 2026 award

Rank	Player	Wins
**1st**	(Australia) Nestory Irankunda	4
2nd	(Australia) Eli Adams	2
2nd	(Australia) Terry Antonis	2
2nd	(France) Éric Bauthéac	2
2nd	(Australia) **Andrew Nabbout**	2

== Awards won by club ==
As of April 2026 award

Club	Wins
Adelaide United	7
Newcastle Jets	7
Brisbane Roar	5
Central Coast Mariners	3
Melbourne Victory	3
Perth Glory	3
Wellington Phoenix	3
Auckland FC	2
Melbourne City	2
Western Sydney Wanderers	2
Western United	2
Macarthur FC	1
Sydney FC	1

== Awards won by nationality ==
As of April 2026 award

Country	Wins
Australia	26
France	2
New Zealand	2
Colombia	1
Costa Rica	1
Denmark	1
Fiji	1
Germany	1
Italy	1
Japan	1
Serbia	1
Spain	1
Uruguay	1
