= Jop van der Linden =

Dutch footballer

Personal information
- Date of birth: 17 July 1990 (age 36)
- Place of birth: Apeldoorn, Netherlands
- Height: 1.88 m (6 ft 2 in)
- Position: Centre back

Youth career
- AVV Colombia
- Vitesse

Senior career*
Years	Team	Apps	(Gls)
2009–2010	Vitesse	0	(0)
2010	→ AGOVV Apeldoorn (loan)	14	(2)
2010–2012	Helmond Sport	54	(9)
2012–2015	Go Ahead Eagles	90	(7)
2015–2018	AZ	14	(1)
2016–2018	→ Jong AZ	15	(1)
2017–2018	→ Willem II (loan)	18	(0)
2018–2019	Sydney FC	9	(0)
Total		214	(20)
- * Club domestic league appearances and goals

Jop van der Linden (born 17 July 1990) is a Dutch former professional footballer who played as a centre back for Vitesse, AGOVV Apeldoorn, Helmond Sport, Go Ahead Eagles, AZ, Willem II, and Sydney FC. He retired in June 2019.
