= Chris Ikonomidis =

Australian soccer player (born 1995)

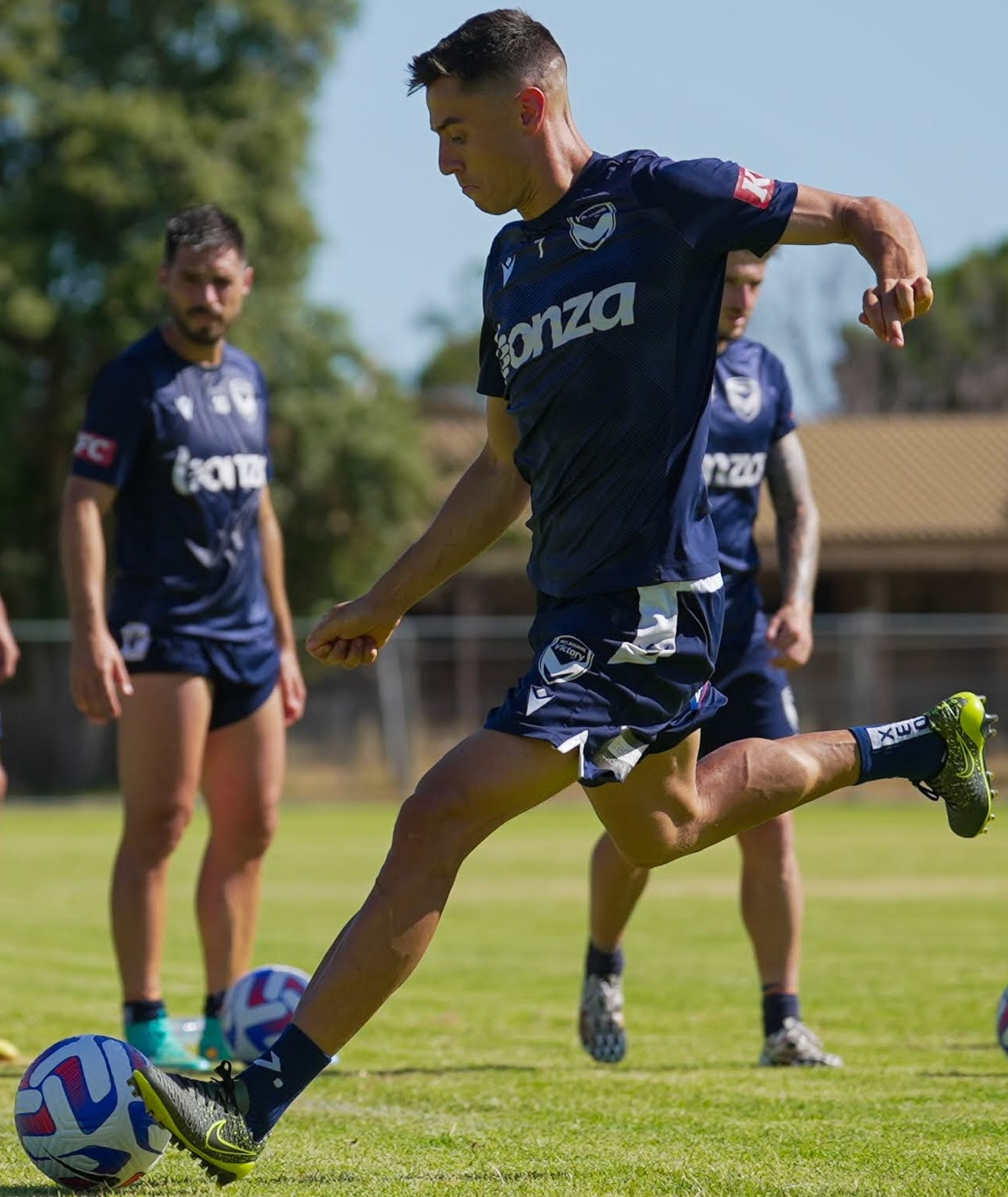
- Ikonomidis in 2023

Personal information
- Full name: Christopher James Ikonomidis
- Date of birth: 4 May 1995 (age 31)
- Place of birth: Cronulla, Sydney, Australia
- Height: 1.80 m (5 ft 11 in)
- Positions: Attacking midfielder; winger

Team information
- Current team: East Bengal

Youth career
- –2009: Cronulla RSL Stingrays
- 2009–2012: Sutherland Sharks
- 2012–2013: Atalanta
- 2013–2015: Lazio

Senior career*
Years	Team	Apps	(Gls)
2015–2018	Lazio	0	(0)
2016	→ Salernitana (loan)	14	(1)
2016–2017	→ AGF (loan)	18	(1)
2017–2018	→ Sydney Wanderers (loan)	10	(3)
2018–2021	Perth Glory	41	(16)
2021–2024	Melbourne Victory	75	(4)
2024–2026	Macarthur	27	(3)
2026–	East Bengal	0	(0)

International career
2013–2015	Australia U20	5	(4)
2014–2016	Australia U23	6	(5)
2015–2021	Australia	27	(10)
- * Club domestic league appearances and goals as of 12:06, 8 October 2026 (UTC)

Christopher James Ikonomidis (/ɪˌkɒnəˈmiːdɪs/ ih-KON-ə-MEED-iss; born 4 May 1995) is an Australian professional soccer player who plays as an attacking midfielder or as a winger for Indian Super League club East Bengal.

He is notable in being capped by his senior national team despite not yet having played a single senior game at club level at the time.

== Club career ==
=== Early career ===
Ikonomidis came from a family who had always played football, started playing himself when he was four years old in Sydney at local team Cronulla RSL. He played youth football for NPL NSW side Sutherland Sharks. In 2010, he was part of the team that won the Oceania zone of the Manchester United Premier Cup, qualifying for the finals in England. His performance in England, including four goals in a 7–0 defeat of a Wigan Athletic youth side.

After scoring several goals on trial with Italian club Atalanta, including one against Chelsea, Ikonomidis was offered a youth contract on his 16th birthday.

=== Lazio ===
In 2013, after 18 months at Atalanta, Ikonomidis was offered a three-year youth contract by Lazio. After strong performances with Lazio's Primavera squad, Ikonomidis made his senior debut for Lazio on 10 December 2015 starting in the final Group Stage match of the 2015–16 UEFA Europa League against AS Saint-Étienne. Ikonomidis signed a new contract on 5 June 2015.

==== Loan to Salernitana ====
For the second half of the 2015–16 season, Lazio loaned Ikonomidis to Salernitana from the Serie B. He made his Serie B debut for Salernitana on 22 January 2016, playing the full match at home to Brescia, where his cross led to a Brescia own goal.

==== Loan to AGF ====
On 31 August 2016, Ikonomidis joined AGF in the Danish Superliga on a season-long loan in a bid for regular game time. He made his debut on 12 September 2016, coming on as a 66th minute substitute in a 3–1 victory over Nordsjælland. He had a good season at AGF, but AGF announced that Ikonomidis was one out of five players that wouldn't continue at the club for the 2017–18 season.

==== Loan to Western Sydney Wanderers ====
On 31 January 2018, Ikonomidis joined A-League club Western Sydney Wanderers on loan until the end of the season. At the end of the season he returned to Lazio.

=== Perth Glory ===
On 11 September 2018, Ikonomidis signed a three-year contract with Perth Glory.

=== Melbourne Victory ===
On 21 July 2021, Ikonmoidis signed a three-year marquee contract with Melbourne Victory.

== International career ==
Ikonomidis is of Greek heritage and was eligible for senior call-ups to both the Australia national team and the Greece national team. He turned down Greece in favour of Australia, being quoted in 2013 saying "I was approached by the Greek federation 12 months ago, but I said no. I am 100 per cent playing for Australia if given the chance".

In 2013, he was called up by Paul Okon to the Australian U20s for the COTIF Tournament in Valencia, and again in the 2014 AFC U-19 Championship, where he played one game against the UAE. He was also called up to the Olyroos for the 2013 AFC U-22 Championship in Oman (which was actually held in 2014), where he played against Kuwait and Japan.

On 11 March 2015, Socceroos coach Ange Postecoglou named Ikonomidis in the senior squad for friendlies against reigning World Champion Germany and Macedonia to be held that month. He was substituted on replacing Nathan Burns in the game against Macedonia in Skopje on 30 March to earn his first senior Socceroos cap. His competitive debut for the Socceroos came on 3 September 2015 during 2018 FIFA World Cup qualification, when he was substituted on in the 61st minute during Australia's 5–0 win over Bangladesh at Perth Oval.

Ikonomidis was named in the Olyroos squad for the 2016 AFC U-23 Championship, although he was recalled later from the camp by Lazio for his loan to Salernitana.

On 30 December 2018, Ikonomidis scored his first international goal for Australia against Oman in an international friendly in the UAE. Ikonomidis scored off a cross by Awer Mabil from within the box.

== Career statistics ==
=== Club ===
As of 25 April 2026

Appearances and goals by club, season and competition
Club	Season	League			National cup (Note: Includes Danish Cup, Australia Cup)		Continental		Total	
Club	Season	Division	Apps	Goals	Apps	Goals	Apps	Goals	Apps	Goals
Lazio	2015–16	Serie A	0	0	0	0	1 (Note: Appearance in UEFA Europa League)	0	1	0
Salernitana (loan)	2015–16	Serie B	14	1	0	0	—		14	1
AGF (loan)	2016–17	Danish Superliga	16	1	2	1	—		18	2
Western Sydney Wanderers (loan)	2017–18	A-League	10	3	0	0	—		10	3
Perth Glory	2018–19	A-League	20	9	0	0	—		20	9
Perth Glory	2019–20	A-League	12	3	0	0	0	0	12	3
Perth Glory	2020–21	A-League	9	4	—		—		9	4
Perth Glory	Total		41	16	0	0	0	0	41	16
Melbourne Victory	2021–22	A-League Men	23	0	2	1	1 (Note: Appearance in AFC Champions League)	0	26	1
Melbourne Victory	2022–23	A-League Men	23	2	1	0	—		24	2
Melbourne Victory	2023–24	A-League Men	29	2	0	0	—		29	2
Melbourne Victory	Total		75	4	3	1	1	0	79	5
Macarthur FC	2024–25	A-League Men	13	2	0	0	—		13	2
Macarthur FC	2025–26	A-League Men	14	1	3	2	5 (Note: Appearances in AFC Champions League Two)	1	22	4
Macarthur FC	Total		27	3	3	2	5	1	35	6
Career total			183	28	8	4	7	1	163	27

=== International ===
As of match played 7 June 2021

Appearances and goals by national team and year
National team	Year	Apps	Goals
Australia	2014	2	0
Australia	2015	4	0
Australia	2016	0	0
Australia	2017	0	0
Australia	2018	1	1
Australia	2019	5	1
Australia	2021	2	0
Total		14	2

As of match played 15 January 2019
Scores and results list Australia's goal tally first, score column indicates score after each Ikonomidis goal.

List of international goals scored by Chris Ikonomidis
No.	Date	Venue	Opponent	Score	Result	Competition
1	30 December 2018	Maktoum bin Rashid Al Maktoum Stadium, Dubai, United Arab Emirates	Oman	2–0	5–0	Friendly
2	15 January 2019	Khalifa bin Zayed Stadium, Al Ain, United Arab Emirates	Syria	2–1	3–2	2019 AFC Asian Cup

== Honours ==
Lazio

- Coppa Italia Primavera: 2013–14, 2014–15
- Supercoppa Primavera: 2014

Perth Glory

- A-League Premiership: 2018–19

Melbourne Victory

- FFA Cup: 2021

Individual

- A-League Young Footballer of the Year: 2018–19
- PFA A-League Team of the Season: 2018–19
