= Oriol Riera =

Spanish footballer & manager (born 1986)

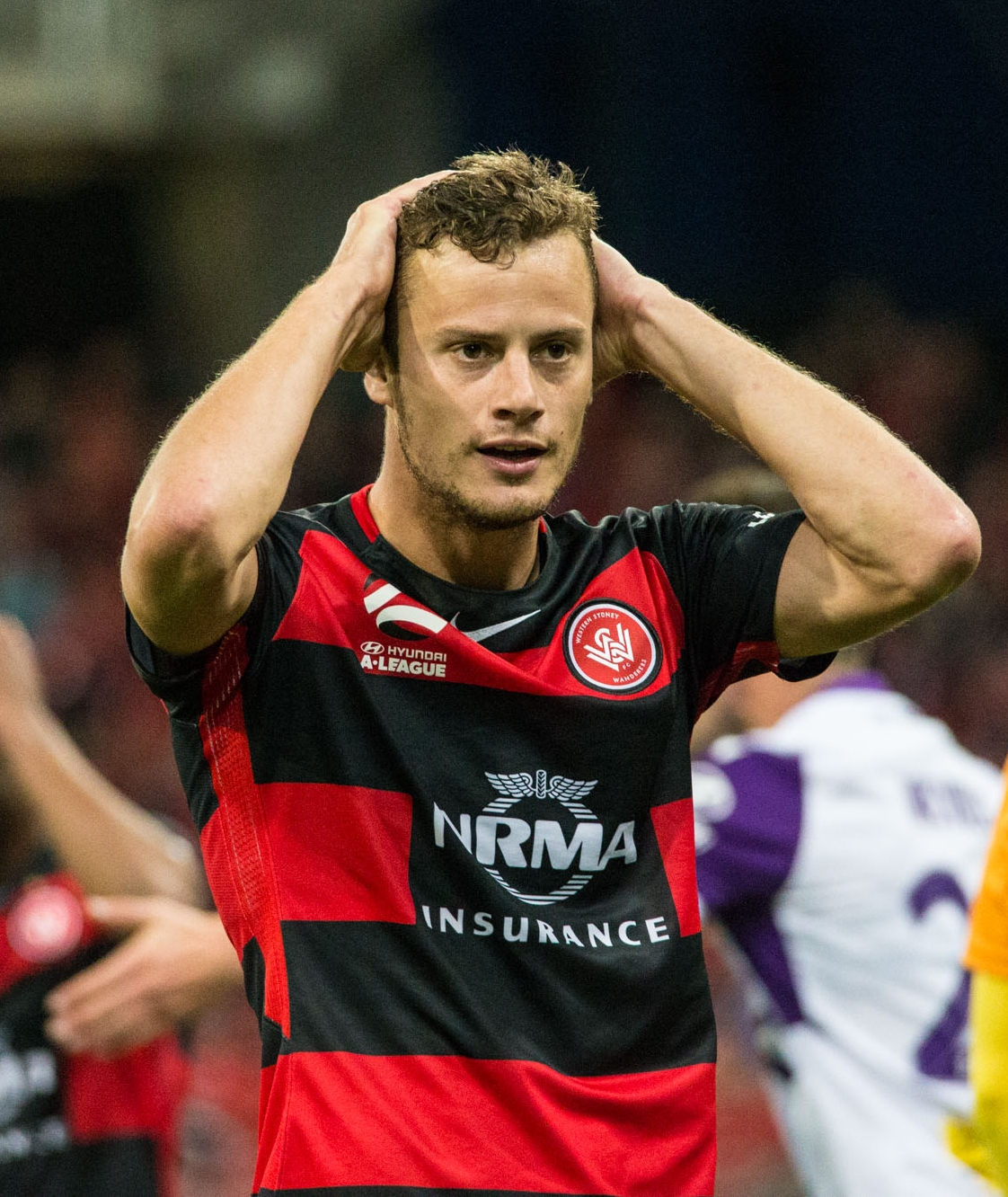
- Riera playing for Western Sydney Wanderers in 2017

Personal information
- Full name: Oriol Riera Magem
- Date of birth: 3 July 1986 (age 40)
- Place of birth: Vic, Spain
- Height: 1.84 m (6 ft 0 in)
- Position: Striker

Youth career
- Osona
- Vic
- 1998–2000: Espanyol
- 2000–2004: Barcelona

Senior career*
Years	Team	Apps	(Gls)
2004–2006	Barcelona C	36	(12)
2004–2006	Barcelona B	31	(4)
2006–2008	Cultural Leonesa	66	(14)
2008–2010	Celta B	64	(22)
2010	Celta	5	(0)
2010–2011	Córdoba	37	(6)
2011–2013	Alcorcón	79	(24)
2013–2014	Osasuna	37	(13)
2014–2015	Wigan Athletic	13	(1)
2015	→ Deportivo La Coruña (loan)	21	(4)
2015–2017	Deportivo La Coruña	22	(2)
2016–2017	→ Osasuna (loan)	22	(4)
2017–2019	Western Sydney Wanderers	49	(25)
2019–2020	Fuenlabrada	33	(1)
Total		515	(132)

International career
2013–2016	Catalonia	2	(1)

Managerial career
- 2020–2021: Alcorcón B (assistant)
- 2022–2023: Tudelano
- 2024: Estepona
- 2025: Unionistas
- 2025–2026: Istra 1961
- * Club domestic league appearances and goals

Oriol Riera Magem (Catalan pronunciation: [uˈɾjɔl ˈrjeɾə]; born 3 July 1986) is a Spanish former professional footballer who played as a striker. He is currently a manager.

After starting out at Barcelona, he went on to amass La Liga totals of 102 matches and 23 goals over four seasons, with Osasuna and Deportivo. He added 148 games and 31 goals in the Segunda División for four clubs, and also competed in England and Australia in a 16-year career.

Riera began working as a head coach in 2023, with Tudelano.

== Club career ==
=== Barcelona ===
Born in Vic, Barcelona, Catalonia, Riera played youth football with FC Barcelona, but spent the vast majority of his tenure with the club in representation of the C and B teams. His official input with the main squad consisted of 13 minutes in a 4–0 away win against Ciudad de Murcia in the round of 32 of the Copa del Rey – when he was still a junior – on 17 December 2003.

=== Journeyman ===
After leaving the Camp Nou, Riera resumed his career in the Segunda División B, where he played with Cultural y Deportiva Leonesa and Celta de Vigo B. He appeared in five Segunda División matches with the latter's main squad, four as a starter.

Riera competed in the second tier from 2009 to 2013, with Córdoba CF and AD Alcorcón. He scored 18 goals in his second year with the latter side (including a hat-trick in a 3–1 victory at UD Las Palmas on 8 September 2012), helping them to the promotion play-offs.

=== Osasuna ===
On 5 July 2013, Riera signed for three seasons with CA Osasuna. He made his La Liga debut on 18 August, coming on as a second-half substitute in a 1–2 home loss to Granada CF. His first goal in the competition came on 20 September of the same year, in a 2–1 win over Elche CF also at the El Sadar Stadium.

=== Wigan Athletic ===
On 28 June 2014, after Osasuna's relegation, Riera agreed to a three-year deal with Wigan Athletic of the Football League Championship, for a reported £2 million fee. He scored his first goal for his new team on 23 August, the only against Blackpool in a 1–0 victory at the DW Stadium.

=== Deportivo ===
Riera returned to his country's top division on 7 January 2015, signing on loan to Deportivo de La Coruña until the end of the season. On 30 June he agreed to a permanent deal at the Estadio Riazor, having narrowly avoided relegation.

On 12 August 2016, Riera returned to his former club Osasuna after agreeing to a one-year loan deal. He scored his first goal for them on 10 September, but in a 5–2 away loss to Real Madrid. He netted another in the 3–3 home draw with Valencia CF (adding an own goal), in a relegation-ending campaign.

=== Western Sydney Wanderers ===
In July 2017, aged 31, Riera cut ties with Deportivo and joined A-League side Western Sydney Wanderers FC as a marquee player shortly after. He scored 15 times in his first season, but his team could only finish seventh.

In April 2019, the club confirmed that Riera was not renewing his contract.

=== Fuenlabrada ===
On 25 July 2019, free agent Riera agreed to a one-year contract with second division newcomers CF Fuenlabrada. On 10 August of the following year, after just one goal in 35 competitive appearances, he announced his retirement at the age of 34 and the desire to remain associated to the sport as manager.

== International career ==
Riera played his first match for the representative Catalan national team on 30 December 2013, scoring the last goal in a 4–1 win over Cape Verde at the Estadi Olímpic Lluís Companys.

== Coaching career ==
In October 2020, Riera was named assistant coach of Alcorcón's reserves. He starting working as a manager in his own right in 2022, being appointed at CD Tudelano in the Segunda Federación and being dismissed on 19 December 2023.

Riera signed for CD Estepona FS on 6 July 2024, remaining in the fourth division. He was sacked the following 31 December, due to poor results.

On 19 June 2025, Riera was appointed at Primera Federación club Unionistas de Salamanca CF. He moved abroad on 17 September that year, on a contract at Croatian Football League's NK Istra 1961.

== Career statistics ==
Appearances and goals by club, season and competition
Club	Season	League			Cup		Continental		Total	
Club	Season	Division	Apps	Goals	Apps	Goals	Apps	Goals	Apps	Goals
Barcelona	2003–04	La Liga	0	0	1	0	0	0	1	0
Barcelona	2004–05	La Liga	0	0	0	0	0	0	0	0
Barcelona	Total		0	0	1	0	0	0	1	0
Barcelona B	2003–04	Segunda División B	2	0	–		—		2	0
Barcelona B	2004–05	Segunda División B	19	3	–		—		19	3
Barcelona B	2005–06	Segunda División B	10	1	–		—		10	1
Barcelona B	Total		31	4	0	0	0	0	31	4
Cultural Leonesa	2006–07	Segunda División B	33	5	0	0	—		33	5
Cultural Leonesa	2007–08	Segunda División B	33	9	0	0	—		33	9
Cultural Leonesa	Total		66	14	0	0	0	0	66	14
Celta B	2008–09	Segunda División B	36	10	–		—		22	10
Celta B	2009–10	Segunda División B	28	12	–		—		23	12
Celta B	Total		64	22	0	0	0	0	64	22
Celta	2009–10	Segunda División	5	0	1	0	—		6	0
Córdoba	2010–11	Segunda División	37	6	4	1	—		41	7
Alcorcón	2011–12	Segunda División	39	6	6	3	—		45	9
Alcorcón	2012–13	Segunda División	40	18	1	0	—		41	18
Alcorcón	Total		79	24	7	3	0	0	86	27
Osasuna	2013–14	La Liga	37	13	4	0	—		41	13
Wigan Athletic	2014–15	Championship	13	1	0	0	—		13	1
Deportivo (loan)	2014–15	La Liga	21	4	0	0	—		21	4
Deportivo	2015–16	La Liga	22	2	3	1	—		25	3
Osasuna (loan)	2016–17	La Liga	22	4	2	0	—		24	4
Western Sydney Wanderers	2017–18	A-League	25	15	4	4	—		29	19
Western Sydney Wanderers	2018–19	A-League	24	10	4	3	—		28	13
Western Sydney Wanderers	Total		49	25	8	7	0	0	57	32
Fuenlabrada	2019–20	Segunda División	33	1	2	0	—		35	1
Career total			479	120	32	12	0	0	511	132

== Managerial statistics ==
As of match played 18 April 2026

Managerial record by team and tenure
Team	Nat	From	To	Record								Ref
Team	Nat	From	To	G	W	D	L	GF	GA	GD	Win %	Ref
Tudelano	(Spain)	2 July 2022	19 December 2023	54	23	15	16	69	54	+15	42.59	
Estepona	(Spain)	6 July 2024	31 December 2024	19	7	7	5	25	17	+8	36.84	
Unionistas	(Spain)	19 June 2025	17 September 2025	7	2	1	4	7	6	+1	28.57	
Istra 1961	(Croatia)	17 September 2025	19 April 2026	25	9	4	12	30	36	−6	36.00	
Career total				105	41	27	37	131	113	+18	39.05	—
