= Ola Toivonen =

Swedish footballer (born 1986)

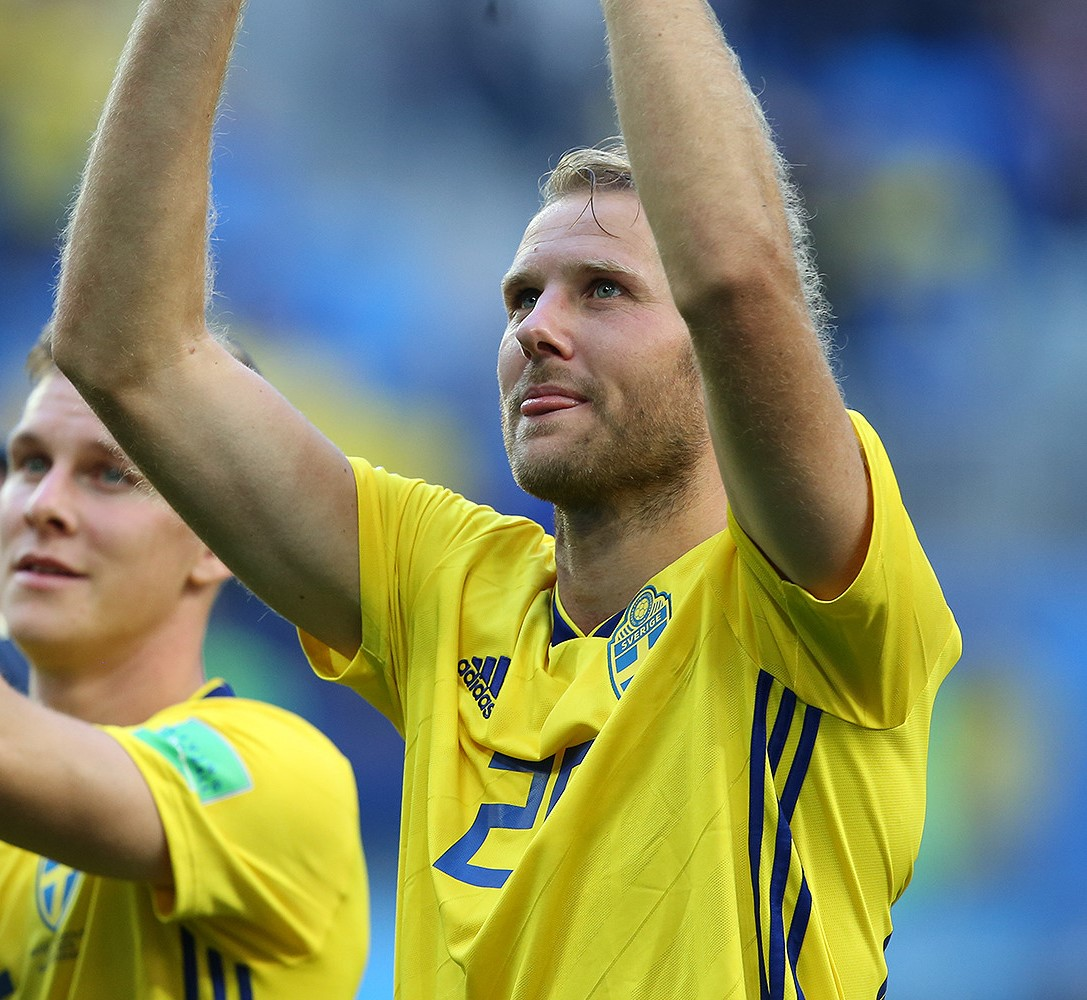
- Toivonen with Sweden at the 2018 FIFA World Cup

Personal information
- Full name: Nils Ola Toivonen
- Date of birth: 3 July 1986 (age 40)
- Place of birth: Degerfors, Sweden
- Height: 1.89 m (6 ft 2 in)
- Positions: Attacking midfielder; forward

Senior career*
Years	Team	Apps	(Gls)
2003–2005	Degerfors IF	41	(8)
2006	Örgryte IS	25	(6)
2007–2009	Malmö FF	51	(17)
2009–2014	PSV	139	(61)
2014–2016	Rennes	46	(14)
2015–2016	→ Sunderland (loan)	12	(0)
2016–2018	Toulouse	58	(7)
2018–2020	Melbourne Victory	38	(23)
2020–2022	Malmö FF	54	(14)
Total		442	(147)

International career
2003	Sweden U17	2	(0)
2004–2005	Sweden U19	11	(6)
2006–2009	Sweden U21	28	(13)
2007–2018	Sweden	64	(14)
- * Club domestic league appearances and goals

Nils Ola Toivonen (Swedish pronunciation: [ˈûːla ˈtɔ̌ɪvʊnɛn]; born 3 July 1986) is a Swedish former professional footballer who played as an attacking midfielder and forward.

After beginning his career in his home town team of Degerfors, he spent time in the top flight for Örgryte before he got signed by Malmö FF before the 2007 season. Having spent two seasons with Malmö, breaking through with 14 league goals in 2008, he joined Eredivisie club PSV Eindhoven in January 2009. Toivonen remained there for five and a half seasons, winning the KNVB Cup in 2012, until a €2.5 million move to Rennes. After a successful spell with Rennes in Ligue 1, Toivonen had a stint with Sunderland in the Premier League before returning to France in 2016 to suit up for Toulouse. He played in Australia for Melbourne Victory between 2018 and 2020, and then returned to Malmö FF before officially retiring from professional football in 2022.

A full international for Sweden between 2007 and 2018, he earned 64 caps and scored 14 goals for his nation, and was part of their squads for UEFA Euro 2012 and the 2018 FIFA World Cup in which Sweden reached the Quarter-Finals .

== Club career ==
=== Early career ===
His father Yrjö was born in Finland and emigrated to Degerfors to work in a factory. Toivonen started his career at Degerfors IF, where he became involved in their campaign in 2005 to avoid relegation from Superettan.

He was then bought by Örgryte, and their manager Zoran Lukić. The first, and only, season in Örgryte ended sadly. Lukić was sacked, and Örgryte finished last in Allsvenskan, and thus was relegated to Superettan. In November 2006, he won the "Newcomer of the Year" award at the annual Swedish football awards.

=== Malmö FF ===
He soon signed a four-year contract with Malmö FF, in a transfer worth more than $1.1 million. He became Malmö's second most expensive player of all time (only Brazilian international Afonso Alves cost Malmö more money, when the club bought him for approximately $1.3 million in 2004, also from Örgryte). In the 2007 season, Toivonen's first at Malmö, the club finished 9th in Allsvenskan and Toivonen scored three goals. The 2008 season went somewhat better for Malmö, finishing 6th, and this was the absolute breakthrough for Toivonen. In 27 games, he managed to score 14 goals as well as seven assists. This drew the attention of some Premier League and Eredivisie clubs, most notably West Ham United and PSV Eindhoven.

=== PSV Eindhoven ===
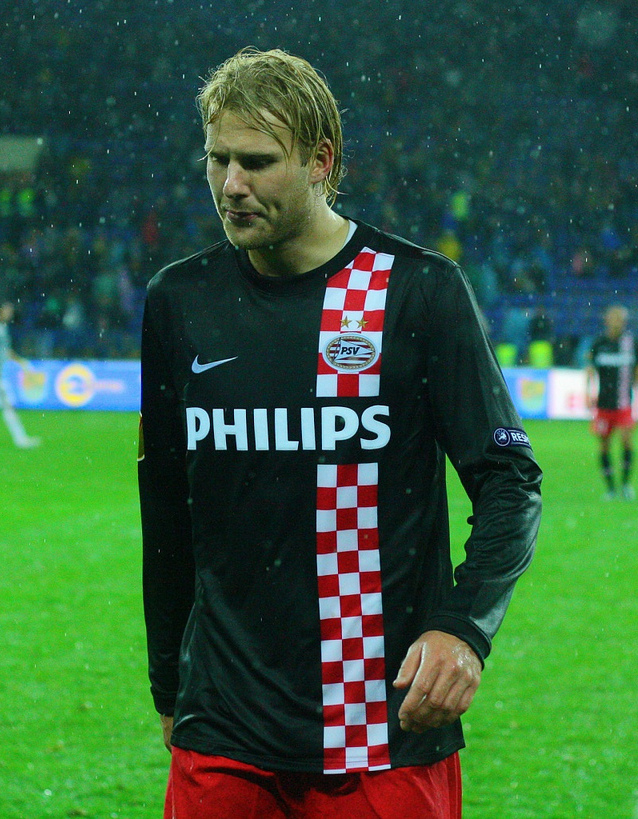
Toivonen playing for PSV in 2010

Toivonen signed a contract with PSV Eindhoven in early 2009. The transfer fee was, according to some source, €3.5 million, and according to other sources €4.5 million. He received a red card in a February 2009 match against FC Volendam, which sidelined him for two matches. His first half season in the Netherlands, saw Toivonen score six goals in 14 appearances for his new club.

On 8 November 2009, Toivonen scored four out of five goals against ADO Den Haag in a 5–1 win, scoring a hat trick in the first 42 minutes of the game. His first full season in the Eredivise proved very successful, adapting quickly, scoring 13 goals.

==== 2010–11 season ====
The first game of the new season kicked off on 7 August 2010 and saw PSV head to the Abe Lenstra Stadion to face Heerenveen. Toivonen struck two second half goals, before Orlando Engelaar added a third, helping to secure a comfortable 3–1 victory. 14 August 2010 saw Toivonen net his second hat trick for PSV, scoring three goals in a 6–0 win over De Graafschap. He added the third goal in a 3–1 win against NEC Nijmegen on 11 September that helped his side climb to first in the Eredivisie rankings. 24 October saw his side record a memorable 10–0 win over rivals Feyenoord at the Philips Stadion. Toivonen scored the first of six goals in the second half. On 4 December Toivonen added two goals to his account in a 5–2 win over Heracles Almelo.

In PSV's second game back following the winter break, Toivonen netted the equalizing goal in a 2–1 win against Willem II. A month later on 20 February 2011, Toivonen scored the third goal, in a 4–1 home win against NAC Breda that saw PSV move two points clear at the top of the Eredivisie. A crucial game against SC Heerenveen on 10 April saw Toivonen return to the squad. He started on the bench, coming on as a 77th-minute substitute for Zakaria Labyad. Toivonen scored PSV's second goal, deep into stoppage time, securing a 2–2 draw. On 24 April, PSV travelled to Rotterdam to play Feyenoord at De Kuip. After embarrassingly losing 10–0 in the first meeting of the season, Feyenoord responded by winning 3–1, Toivonen scored the only goal for the Boerens, ending PSV's title hopes. The 2010–11 campaign saw Toivonen score 15 Eredivisie goals and 3 Europa League goals for PSV, making him the club's second leading goalscorer of the season behind Balázs Dzsudzsák.

==== 2011–12 season ====
With strike partner Balázs Dzsudzsák leaving PSV to join Russian Premier League side Anzhi Makhachkala, Toivonen was required to fill in and contribute with more goals for the new season. Toivonen scored his first goal of the season in PSV's 3–0 win over ADO Den Haag on 21 August. He followed this effort up with another goal in his side's 5–0 thrashing of Austrian Bundesliga outfit SV Ried in the qualifying stages of the Europa League. PSV and Toivonen continued their rich goal-scoring form, as they hammered Excelsior 6–1 on 28 August with Toivonen netting a brace.

==== 2012–13 season ====
Due to injuries, Toivonen only made 17 appearances in which he scored eight times. At the end of the season, PSV wanted to sell Toivonen as he had refused to extend his contract which would expire in the summer of 2014. Norwich City showed interest in the player, but preferred countryman Johan Elmander after Toivonen had been dawdling too long in the opinion of the club.

==== 2013–14 season ====
Although both PSV and Toivonen were dissatisfied after a transfer had failed, Toivonen made 14 appearances in which he scored once. In the winter break PSV announced that Toivonen would not play a single match for PSV in the second half of the season. Both the player and the club wanted to disband.

=== Rennes ===
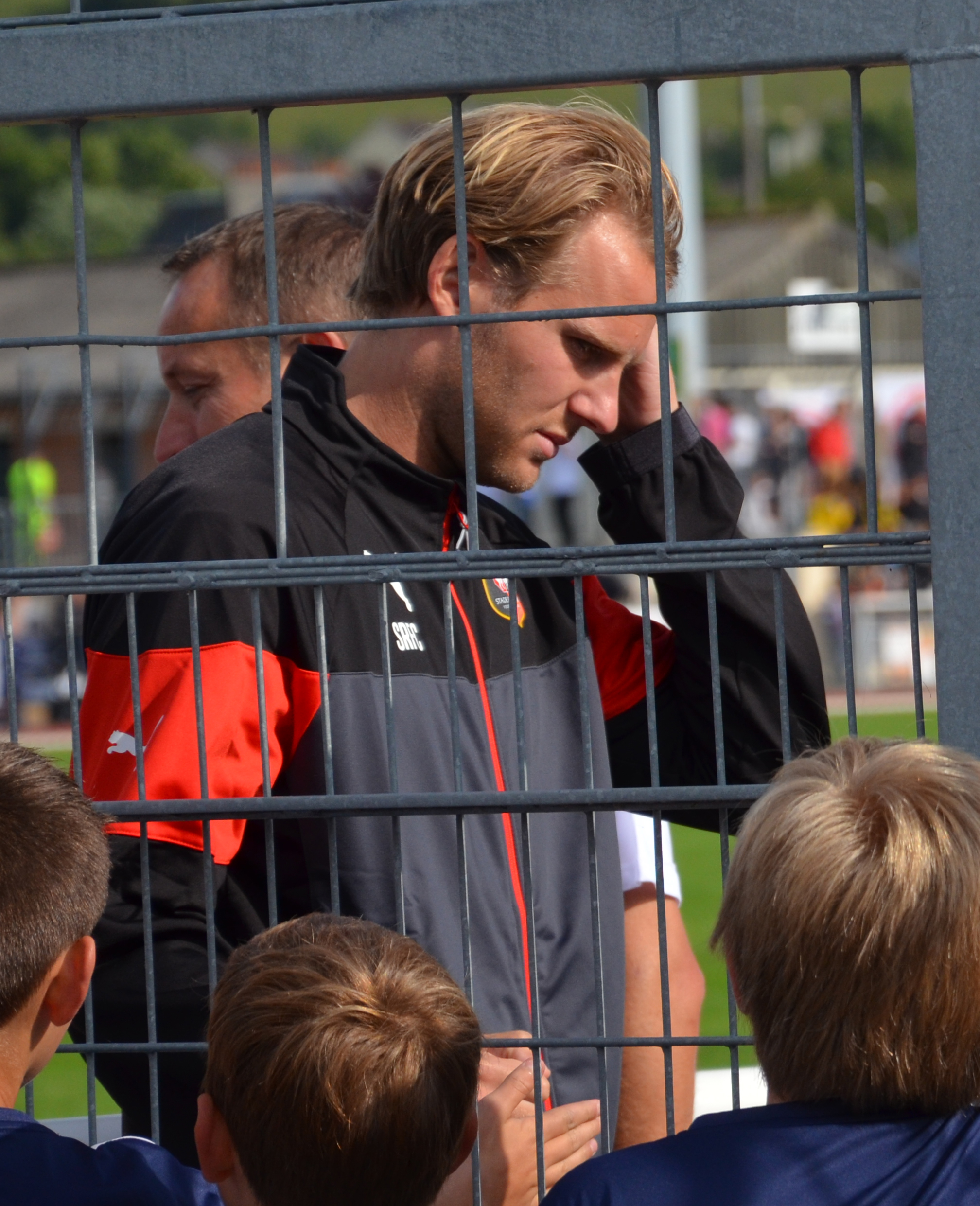
Toivonen with Rennes in 2014

On 20 January 2014, it was announced that Toivonen had been sold to Rennes for a transfer fee of €2.5 million.

==== Loan to Sunderland ====
On 28 August 2015, Toivonen joined Premier League side Sunderland on a season-long loan, linking up with his former manager at PSV Dick Advocaat. The following day, he made his debut as a half-time substitute for Lee Cattermole in at Aston Villa, and assisted former PSV teammate Jeremain Lens's equaliser in a 2–2 draw. Toivonen scored his first goal on 22 September 2015, in a 4–1 League Cup third round defeat at home to Manchester City.

=== Toulouse ===
On 4 August 2016, Toivonen signed for French club Toulouse FC.

=== Melbourne Victory ===
On 31 August 2018, it was announced he had signed with A-League club Melbourne Victory FC.

In his first season at the club, Toivonen made 26 appearances across all competitions with a return of 17 goals, 15 of which were netted in the A-League. This led to Toivonen being awarded the TAC Victoria Golden Boot at the 2019 Victory Medal awards night. He was also the only Melbourne Victory player to be named to the A-League Team of the Season.

On 30 September 2019, in advance of the 2019–20 campaign, Toivonen was named the Victory's new club captain replacing Carl Valeri who held the position between 2015 and 2019. In May 2020, Toivonen was reported as having rejected a contract extension to return to former club Malmö FF on a free transfer.

=== Return to Malmö FF ===
Toivonen was officially announced as a Malmö FF player on a 2.5 year-contract on 8 June. On 8 November 2020, Toivonen scored the third goal in a 4–0 win against IK Sirius to help Malmö FF become Swedish Champions for the 21st time, and winning Toivonen his first-ever league title. In 2021, Toivonen played eight matches before suffering a knee injury that kept him out for the rest of the season. The team went on to win the league, securing Toivonen his second league title with Malmö FF. Toivonen made his return more than ten months after sustaining his injury, in the 2022 opener against Kalmar FF.

He retired from professional football after the 2022 Allsvenskan season.

== International career ==
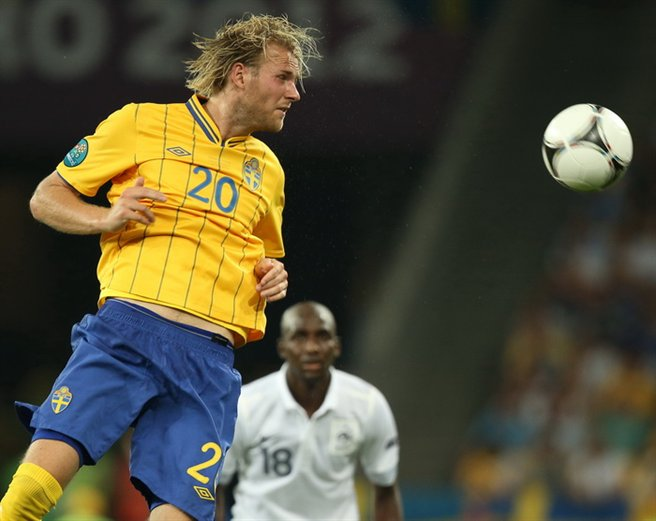
Toivonen playing for Sweden at UEFA Euro 2012.

On 21 August 2007, he scored a hat trick (including two penalties) for Sweden U21 against Wales U21 in a 4–3 friendly defeat. He was a member of the U-21 national team at the 2009 European Championship in Sweden and scored three times in the competition against Italy U21, Serbia U21, and a superb freekick against England U21 which contributed to a comeback from 3–0 down to 3–3 with Toivonen scoring the second goal.

Toivonen's full international debut came on 14 January 2007, when Sweden lost 2–0 away to Venezuela.

Leading up to the 2010 FIFA World Cup in South Africa, Sweden played Bosnia and Herzegovina in a friendly on 29 May. Toivonen was included in the starting lineup, as Sweden were without striker Zlatan Ibrahimović. Toivonen scored the opening goal in the 44th minute, giving Sweden a lead at half time. This goal was Toivonen's first at international level. Blackburn Rovers defender Martin Olsson scored a brace in the second half, leading Sweden to a 4–2 win. On 11 August 2010, Toivonen started for the national side in a friendly against Scotland at the Råsunda Stadium in Stockholm. Toivonen grabbed Sweden's third goal in the 55th minute, his second international goal, helping to seal a 3–0 win for the home side.

In May 2018, he was named in Sweden's 23 man squad for the 2018 FIFA World Cup in Russia. He scored the first goal of the match in a 2–1 defeat to Germany on 23 June 2018. In August 2018, Toivonen announced his retirement from international football.

== Personal life ==
Toivonen is married to Emma and has two children, Selma and Nils.

== Career statistics ==
=== Club ===
Appearances and goals by club, season and competition
Club	Season	League			Cup		Continental		Other		Total	
Club	Season	Division	Apps	Goals	Apps	Goals	Apps	Goals	Apps	Goals	Apps	Goals
Degerfors IF	2003	Division 2 Västra Svealand					—		—			
Degerfors IF	2004	Division 2 Västra Svealand					—		—			
Degerfors IF	2005	Superettan	27	5			—		—		27	5
Degerfors IF	Total		41	8	0	0	0	0	0	0	41	8
Örgryte IS	2006	Allsvenskan	25	6			—		—		25	6
Malmö FF	2007	Allsvenskan	24	3			0	0	—		24	3
Malmö FF	2008	Allsvenskan	27	14			0	0	—		27	14
Malmö FF	Total		51	17	0	0	0	0	0	0	51	17
PSV	2008–09	Eredivisie	14	6	0	0	—		—		14	6
PSV	2009–10	Eredivisie	33	13	3	0	12	1	—		48	14
PSV	2010–11	Eredivisie	28	15	2	1	12	4	—		42	20
PSV	2011–12	Eredivisie	33	18	4	2	12	6	—		49	26
PSV	2012–13	Eredivisie	17	8	1	0	3	1	1	2	22	11
PSV	2013–14	Eredivisie	14	1	2	0	6	1	—		22	2
PSV	Total		139	61	12	3	46	13	1	2	198	79
Rennes	2013–14	Ligue 1	15	7	3	1	—		—		18	8
Rennes	2014–15	Ligue 1	30	7	3	0	—		2	0	35	7
Rennes	2015–16	Ligue 1	1	0	0	0	—		—		1	0
Rennes	Total		46	14	6	1	0	0	2	0	54	15
Sunderland (loan)	2015–16	Premier League	12	0	1	0	—		1	1	14	1
Toulouse	2016–17	Ligue 1	35	7	1	0	—		2	0	38	7
Toulouse	2017–18	Ligue 1	23	0	0	0	—		5	2	28	2
Toulouse	Total		58	7	1	0	0	0	7	2	66	9
Melbourne Victory	2018–19	A-League	22	15	0	0	4	2	0	0	26	17
Melbourne Victory	2019–20	A-League	14	9	1	0	3	2	0	0	18	11
Melbourne Victory	Total		36	24	1	0	7	4	0	0	44	28
Malmö FF	2020	Allsvenskan	21	8	2	1	2	1	—		25	10
Malmö FF	2021	Allsvenskan	8	0	3	1	0	0	—		11	1
Malmö FF	2022	Allsvenskan	25	6	1	0	0	0	—		26	6
Malmö FF	Total		54	14	6	2	2	1	0	0	62	17
Career total			462	151	27	6	55	18	11	5	555	180

=== International ===
Appearances and goals by national team and year
National team	Year	Apps	Goals
Sweden	2007	2	0
Sweden	2008	0	0
Sweden	2009	2	0
Sweden	2010	8	2
Sweden	2011	9	2
Sweden	2012	8	2
Sweden	2013	6	0
Sweden	2014	5	2
Sweden	2015	5	1
Sweden	2016	3	1
Sweden	2017	7	2
Sweden	2018	9	2
Total		64	14

Scores and results list Sweden's goal tally first, score column indicates score after each Toivonen goal

List of international goals scored by Ola Toivonen
No.	Date	Venue	Opponent	Score	Result	Competition
1	29 May 2010	Råsunda Stadium, Solna, Sweden	Bosnia and Herzegovina	1–0	4–2	Friendly
2	11 August 2010	Råsunda Stadium, Solna, Sweden	Scotland	3–0	3–0	Friendly
3	3 June 2011	Zimbru Stadium, Chişinău, Moldavia	Moldova	1–0	4–1	UEFA Euro 2012 qualification
4	11 October 2011	Råsunda Stadium, Solna, Sweden	Netherlands	3–2	3–2	UEFA Euro 2012 qualification
5	30 May 2012	Gamla Ullevi, Gothenburg, Sweden	Iceland	2–0	3–2	Friendly
6	5 June 2012	Råsunda Stadium, Solna, Sweden	Serbia	1–0	2–1	Friendly
7	5 March 2014	Ankara 19 Mayıs Stadium, Ankara, Turkey	Turkey	1–1	1–2	Friendly
8	9 October 2014	Friends Arena, Solna, Sweden	Russia	1–1	1–1	UEFA Euro 2016 qualification
9	31 March 2015	Friends Arena, Solna, Sweden	Iran	3–1	3–1	Friendly
10	10 October 2016	Friends Arena, Solna, Sweden	Bulgaria	1–0	3–0	2018 FIFA World Cup qualification
11	9 June 2017	Friends Arena, Solna, Sweden	France	2–1	2–1	2018 FIFA World Cup qualification
12	7 October 2017	Friends Arena, Solna, Sweden	Luxembourg	8–0	8–0	2018 FIFA World Cup qualification
13	24 March 2018	Friends Arena, Solna, Sweden	Chile	1–1	1–2	Friendly
14	23 June 2018	Fisht Olympic Stadium, Sochi, Russia	Germany	1–0	1–2	2018 FIFA World Cup

== Honours ==
PSV

- KNVB Cup: 2011–12
- Johan Cruyff Shield: 2012

Malmö FF

- Allsvenskan: 2020, 2021
- Svenska Cupen: 2021–22

Sweden U21

- UEFA European Under-21 Championship bronze: 2009

Individual

- Swedish Newcomer of the Year: 2006
- Stor Grabb: 2012
- A-League Team of the Season: 2018–19
- TAC Victoria Golden Boot: 2019
