= Éric Bauthéac =

French footballer (born 1987)

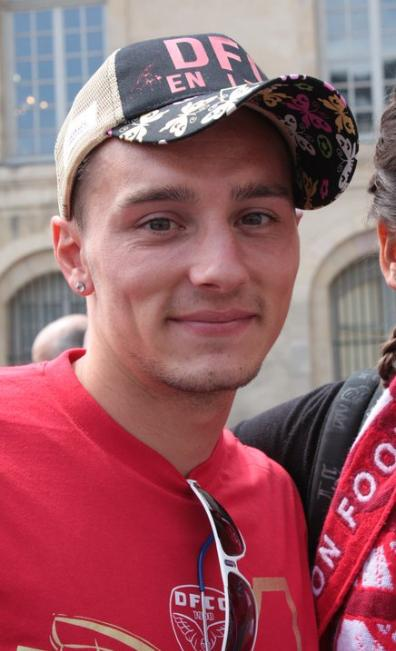
- Bauthéac in 2011

Personal information
- Date of birth: 24 August 1987 (age 39)
- Place of birth: Bagnols-sur-Cèze, France
- Height: 1.68 m (5 ft 6 in)
- Position: Attacking midfielder

Youth career
- 1995–2000: Bagnols Pont
- 2000–2007: Saint-Étienne

Senior career*
Years	Team	Apps	(Gls)
2007–2010	Cannes	77	(15)
2010–2012	Dijon	70	(9)
2012–2015	Nice	97	(21)
2015–2017	Lille	41	(2)
2017–2019	Brisbane Roar	45	(9)
2019–2022	Omonia	60	(10)
2022–2023	Nea Salamina	26	(0)
- * Club domestic league appearances and goals as of 5 June 2023

Éric Bauthéac (born 24 August 1987) is a retired French professional footballer who played as an attacking midfielder.

He has also played in France for Saint-Étienne, Lille, Dijon, Nice and Cannes.

== Career ==
Bauthéac scored his first goal for Brisbane Roar in an A-League match against Melbourne City. He left the Roar after the 2018–19 season.

On 25 July 2019, he signed a two-year contract with Omonia Nicosia. He made his debut on 24 August 2019 against Doxa Katokopias in the 2019–20 season premiere and scored the second goal of the match with a direct free kick.

== Career statistics ==
As of 30 May 2022

Appearances and goals by club, season and competition
Club	Season	League			National cup		League cup		Continental		Other		Total	
Club	Season	Division	Apps	Goals	Apps	Goals	Apps	Goals	Apps	Goals	Apps	Goals	Apps	Goals
Dijon	2010–11	Ligue 2	36	6	0	0	1	0	—		—		37	6
Dijon	2011–12	Ligue 1	34	3	3	1	2	2	—		—		39	6
Dijon	Total		70	9	3	1	3	2	0	0	0	0	76	12
Nice	2012–13	Ligue 1	35	9	2	0	2	1	—		—		39	10
Nice	2013–14	Ligue 1	27	4	2	0	2	0	2	0	—		33	4
Nice	2014–15	Ligue 1	35	8	1	0	1	0	—		—		37	8
Nice	Total		97	21	5	0	5	1	2	0	0	0	109	22
Lille	2015–16	Ligue 1	28	2	2	0	4	1	—		—		34	3
Lille	2016–17	Ligue 1	13	0	2	0	—		2	0	—		17	0
Lille	Total		41	2	4	0	4	1	2	0	0	0	51	3
Brisbane Roar	2017–18	A-League	21	2	0	0	—		1	1	—		22	3
Brisbane Roar	2018–19	A-League	24	7	1	0	—		—		—		25	7
Brisbane Roar	Total		45	9	1	0	0	0	1	1	0	0	47	10
Omonia	2019–20	First Division	18	4	1	0	—		—		—		19	4
Omonia	2020–21	First Division	22	5	1	0	—		9	1	—		32	6
Omonia	2021–22	First Division	20	1	2	1	—		7	0	—		30	2
Omonia	Total		60	10	4	1	—		16	1	0	0	81	12
Nea Salamina	2022–23	First Division	26	0	4	1	—		—		—		30	1
Career total			339	51	21	3	12	4	21	2	0	0	393	60

== Honours ==
Omonia

- Cypriot First Division: 2020–21
- Cypriot Cup: 2021–22
- Cypriot Super Cup: 2021
