= List of Wellington Phoenix FC players =

Wellington Phoenix Football Club is a New Zealand-based professional football club located in Wellington, on the country's North Island. The club was formed in 2007 and played their first competitive match in July 2007 in the 2007 A-League Pre-Season Challenge Cup. The club has always played home matches primarily at Wellington Regional Stadium. Since playing their first competitive match nearly 100 players have made a competitive first-team appearance for the club, those players are listed here.

Wellington's record appearance-maker is Andrew Durante, who has made a total of 212 appearances over 8 years at the club. Durante also holds the record for most starts, having started in 210 games. Roy Krishna is the club's top goalscorer, with 51 goals in his six seasons at the club. Eleven other players have made more than 100 appearances for the club.

== List of players ==
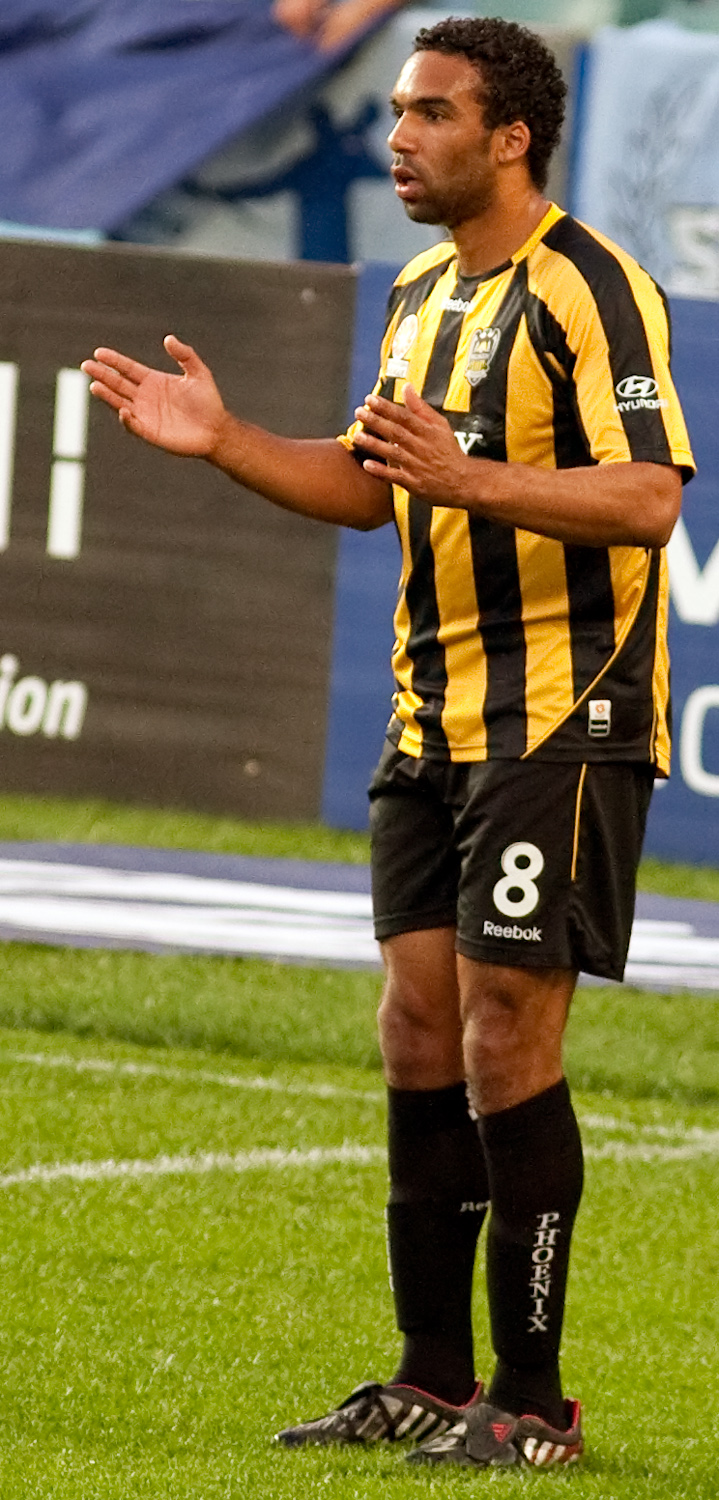
Paul Ifill held the club's goal-scoring record until 2018.

- Appearances and goals are for first-team competitive matches only, including A-League, FFA Cup and A-League Pre-Season Challenge Cup matches.
- Players are listed according to the date of their first team debut for the club.

Statistics correct as of 13 June 2018

Table headers

- Nationality – If a player played international football, the country/countries he played for are shown. Otherwise, the player's nationality is given as their country of birth.
- Wellington Phoenix career – The year of the player's first appearance for Wellington Phoenix to the year of his last appearance.
- Starts – The number of games started.
- Sub – The number of games played as a substitute.
- Total – The total number of games played, both as a starter and as a substitute.

Position key
GK	Goalkeeper
DF	Defender
MF	Midfielder
FW	Forward
U	Utility player^{1}

List of Wellington Phoenix FC players
Name	Nationality	Position	Wellington Phoenix career	Starts	Subs	Total	Goals	Ref
Name	Nationality	Position	Wellington Phoenix career	Appearances			Goals	Ref
Royce Brownlie	Australia	FW	2007–2008	2	11	13	0	
Jeremy Christie	New Zealand	U	2007–2009	18	14	32	0	
Cleberson	Brazil	DF	2007	5	0	5	0	
Vaughan Coveny	New Zealand	FW	2007–2008	22	14	36	1	
Daniel	New Zealand	MF	2007–2012	61	54	115	10	
Michael Ferrante	Australia	MF	2007–2009	41	10	51	1	
Tony Lochhead	New Zealand	DF	2007–2013	138	0	138	1	
Glen Moss	New Zealand	GK	2007–2009; 2013–2017	149	1	150	0	
Steven O'Dor	Australia	DF	2007–2008	15	2	17	0	
Steven Old	New Zealand	DF	2007–2008	13	3	16	2	
Shane Smeltz	New Zealand	FW	2007–2009; 2017	56	4	60	28	
Felipe	Brazil	MF	2007–2008	15	6	21	3	
Greg Draper	New Zealand	FW	2007–2008	0	4	4	0	
Ross Aloisi	Australia	MF	2007–2008	16	1	17	2	
Karl Dodd	Australia	DF	2007–2009	41	2	43	1	
Vince Lia	Australia	MF	2007–2017	181	21	202	4	
Mark Paston	New Zealand	GK	2007–2013	74	0	74	0	
Richard Johnson	Australia	MF	2007–2008	18	7	25	0	
George	Brazil	MF	2007	0	4	4	0	
Tim Brown	New Zealand	MF	2007–2012	107	5	112	23	
Ahmad Elrich	Australia	MF	2007–2008	11	2	13	1	
Kosta Barbarouses	New Zealand	FW	2007–2010; 2016–2017	32	15	47	8	
Kristian Rees	Australia	DF	2007–2008	9	0	9	1	
Leo Bertos	New Zealand	MF	2008–2014	112	19	131	9	
Andrew Durante	New Zealand	DF	2008–2019	279	2	281	4	
Gao Leilei	China	MF	2008	9	2	11	1	
Jonathan McKain	Australia	DF	2008–2010	39	1	40	2	
Troy Hearfield	Australia	U	2008–2011	50	24	74	4	
Ben Sigmund	New Zealand	DF	2008–2016	181	6	187	7	
Adam Kwasnik	Australia	FW	2008–2009	8	7	15	1	
Manny Muscat	Malta	U	2008–2016	194	2	196	4	
Dave Mulligan	New Zealand	DF	2008	3	0	3	0	
Fred	Brazil	MF	2008	3	0	3	1	
Chris Greenacre	England	FW	2009–2012	73	11	84	19	
Paul Ifill	Barbados	U	2009–2013	92	14	106	32	
Diego	Brazil	MF	2009–2010	5	7	12	0	
Reece Crowther	Australia	GK	2009	5	1	6	0	
Marco Rojas	New Zealand	MF	2009–2011	10	11	21	2	
Adrian Caceres	Australia	MF	2009–2010	6	13	19	0	
Jiang Chen	China	FW	2009	0	2	2	0	
Liam Reddy	Australia	GK	2009–2010	12	0	12	0	
Eugène Dadi	Ivory Coast	FW	2010	5	5	10	5	
Dylan Macallister	Australia	FW	2010–2011	15	7	22	7	
Oscar Roberto Cornejo	Argentina	MF	2010–2011	0	5	5	0	
Mirjan Pavlović	Australia	FW	2010–2012	1	24	25	2	
Nick Ward	Australia	MF	2010–2012	28	17	45	3	
Danny Vuković	Australia	GK	2010–2011	16	1	17	1	
Jade North	Australia	DF	2010–2011	19	0	19	0	
Simon Elliott	New Zealand	MF	2010	4	0	4	0	
James Musa	New Zealand	DF	2010–2011	2	1	3	0	
Sean Lovemore	New Zealand	FW	2011	0	1	1	0	
Dani Sánchez	Spain	MF	2011–2013	33	8	41	7	
Jimmy Downey	Australia	U	2011–2012	0	7	7	0	
Tony Warner	Trinidad and Tobago	GK	2011–2012	15	0	15	0	
Alex Smith	United States	U	2011–2013	26	15	41	1	
Nikolas Tsattalios	Australia	DF	2011–2012	1	4	5	0	
Brent Griffiths	Australia	DF	2011–2012	4	3	7	0	
Jeremy Brockie	New Zealand	FW	2012–2015	47	12	59	23	
Louis Fenton	New Zealand	U	2012–2022	120	44	164	9	
Stein Huysegems	Belgium	FW	2012–2014	43	5	48	15	
Benjamin Totori	Solomon Islands	FW	2012–2013	2	13	15	0	
Tyler Boyd	New Zealand	FW	2012–2015	17	32	49	4	
Ricardo Clarke	Panama	MF	2012	0	2	2	0	
Tom Biss	New Zealand	MF	2012	1	0	1	0	
Michael Boxall	New Zealand	DF	2012–2015	28	12	40	2	
Luke Rowe	New Zealand	DF	2012–2013	2	0	2	0	
Jacob Spoonley	New Zealand	GK	2012, 2013–2014	3	0	3	0	
Cameron Lindsay	New Zealand	MF	2013	0	4	4	0	
Isaka Cernak	Australia	MF	2013	3	3	6	0	
Ian Hogg	New Zealand	DF	2013	3	0	3	0	
Corey Gameiro	Australia	FW	2013	7	0	7	1	
Luke Adams	New Zealand	DF	2013–2014	2	1	3	0	
Reece Caira	Australia	DF	2013–2014	10	1	11	0	
Kenny Cunningham	Costa Rica	FW	2013–2015	23	18	41	11	
Carlos Hernández	Costa Rica	MF	2013–2014	20	1	21	7	
Jason Hicks	New Zealand	MF	2013–2015	6	25	31	2	
Albert Riera	Spain	MF	2013–2016	66	4	70	0	
Matthew Ridenton	New Zealand	MF	2013–2018; 2021	48	35	83	4	
Roy Krishna	Fiji	FW	2014–2019	112	15	127	52	
Josh Brindell-South	Australia	DF	2014	3	1	4	0	
Alex Rufer	New Zealand	FW	2014–	91	39	130	2	
Shaun Timmins	Ireland	DF	2014	5	1	6	0	
Hamish Watson	New Zealand	FW	2014; 2016–2017	14	26	40	6	
Roly Bonevacia	Curaçao	MF	2014–2017	79	4	83	14	
Nathan Burns	Australia	FW	2014–2015; 2018–2019	44	7	51	13	
Tom Doyle	New Zealand	DF	2014–2019	74	14	88	2	
Michael McGlinchey	New Zealand	MF	2014–2018	77	11	88	11	
Alex Rodriguez	Spain	MF	2014–2017	57	16	73	1	
Joel Griffiths	Australia	FW	2015	3	2	5	1	
Kwabena Appiah	Australia	MF	2015–2016	2	15	17	1	
Lewis Italiano	Australia	GK	2015–2018	21	0	21	0	
Andrew Blake	New Zealand	FW	2015	1	0	1	0	
Tamupiwa Dimairo	New Zealand	MF	2015	0	1	1	0	
Joel Stevens	New Zealand	FW	2015–2016	2	4	6	0	
Blake Powell	Australia	FW	2015–2016	13	10	23	8	
Jeffrey Sarpong	Netherlands	FW	2015–2016	9	4	13	0	
Justin Gulley	New Zealand	DF	2015–2016; 2019	8	1	9	0	
Troy Danaskos	Australia	DF	2015–2016	4	2	6	0	
Dylan Fox	Australia	DF	2016–2019	29	12	41	0	
James McGarry	New Zealand	MF	2016–2017; 2021–2022	25	16	41	0	
Guilherme Finkler	Brazil	MF	2016–2017	23	6	29	7	
Adam Parkhouse	Australia	U	2016–2018	19	18	37	0	
Marco Rossi	Italy	DF	2016–2018	37	1	38	0	
Jacob Tratt	Australia	DF	2016–2017	20	0	20	0	
Logan Rogerson	New Zealand	MF	2016–2018	2	10	12	2	
Ben Litfin	Australia	MF	2016	0	2	2	0	
Ryan Lowry	Australia	DF	2016–2019	14	6	20	0	
Sarpreet Singh	New Zealand	MF	2017–2019	30	11	41	9	
Scott Galloway	Australia	DF	2017–2018	19	3	22	0	
Goran Paracki	Croatia	MF	2017–2018	24	1	25	1	
Andrija Kaluđerović	Serbia	FW	2017–2018	21	1	22	9	
Daniel Mullen	Australia	DF	2017–2018	17	1	18	1	
Keegan Smith	New Zealand	GK	2017	6	0	6	0	
Matija Ljujić	Serbia	MF	2018	10	3	13	2	
Liberato Cacace	New Zealand	U	2018–2020	59	1	60	4	
Monty Patterson	New Zealand	FW	2018	2	2	4	0	
Tando Velaphi	Australia	GK	2018	4	0	4	0	
Oliver Sail	New Zealand	GK	2018–2023	83	1	84	0	
Michał Kopczyński	Poland	MF	2018–2019	18	6	24	0	
Filip Kurto	Poland	GK	2018–2019	26	0	26	0	
Steven Taylor	England	DF	2018–2021	61	2	63	3	
Ben Waine	New Zealand	MF	2018–2022	39	43	82	22	
Mandi	Spain	MF	2018–2019	25	0	25	2	
David Williams	Australia	FW	2018–2019	22	5	27	11	
Max Burgess	Australia	MF	2018–2019	7	16	23	0	
Mitch Nichols	Australia	U	2018–2019	4	4	8	0	
Reuben Way	Australia	U	2018	0	1	1	0	
Cillian Sheridan	Ireland	FW	2019	2	15	17	1	
Antony Golec	Australia	DF	2019	5	1	6	0	
Callan Elliot	New Zealand	MF	2019–2020; 2021–2023	37	16	53	1	
Gianni Stensness	New Zealand	MF	2019	1	3	4	0	
David Ball	England	FW	2019–	97	5	102	16	
Luke DeVere	Australia	DF	2019–2021	31	0	31	0	
Cameron Devlin	Australia	MF	2019–2021	35	10	45	2	
Te Atawhai Hudson-Wihongi	New Zealand	DF	2019–2021	5	11	16	0	
Stefan Marinovic	New Zealand	GK	2019–2021	34	0	34	0	
Callum McCowatt	New Zealand	FW	2019–2020	14	12	26	2	
Liam McGing	Australia	DF	2019–2021	7	4	11	0	
Tim Payne	New Zealand	MF	2019–	89	3	92	0	
Walter Scott	Australia	MF	2019–2020	2	2	4	0	
Ulises Dávila	Mexico	MF	2019–2021	45	5	50	19	
Jaushua Sotirio	Australia	FW	2019–2022	39	30	69	16	
Reno Piscopo	Australia	MF	2019–2022	50	11	61	8	
Matti Steinmann	Germany	MF	2019–2020	24	0	24	0	
Gary Hooper	England	FW	2019–2020; 2021–2022	22	14	36	13	
Sam Sutton	New Zealand	MF	2019–	46	14	60	2	
Joshua Laws	Australia	DF	2021–2023	48	8	56	0	
Clayton Lewis	New Zealand	MF	2021–2023	59	10	69	3	
Mirza Muratovic	Australia	FW	2021	3	5	8	2	
Tomer Hemed	Israel	FW	2021	16	5	21	11	

== Notes ==
- A utility player is one who is considered to play in more than one position.
