= 2018–19 Wellington Phoenix FC season =

Wellington Phoenix
2018–19 season
- Chairman: Rob Morrison
- Manager: Marko Rudan
- Stadium: Westpac Stadium, Wellington
- A-League: 6th
- A-League Finals Series: Elimination-finals
- FFA Cup: Round of 32
- Top goalscorer: League: Roy Krishna (18 goals); All: Roy Krishna (19 goals)
- Highest home attendance: 23,648 vs. Melbourne Victory (15 February 2019)
- Lowest home attendance: 4,829 vs. Perth Glory (2 December 2018)
- Average home league attendance: 8,533
Home colours	Away colours

The 2018–19 Wellington Phoenix season was the club's 12th season since its establishment in 2007. The club participated in the A-League for the 12th time, the FFA Cup for the fifth time, and fielded a reserves squad in the ISPS Handa Premiership for the fifth time.

== Review ==
This season marked the club surpassing its record of 7 games unbeaten to 9 games unbeaten. Roy Krishna became Wellington Phoenix's all time leading goal scorer overtaking Paul Ifill's record of 33 and also broke the record for most goals in a single season for the club with 19. The club also broke its record of biggest home attendance for a non-final match with 23,648 people against Melbourne Victory in Eden Park on 15 February 2019. This season was the first time since 2015 the Phoenix played in the Finals Series. However, they lost 3-1 in the elimination final to Melbourne Victory.

== Players ==
=== Squad information ===
Note: Flags indicate national team as defined under FIFA eligibility rules; some limited exceptions apply. Players may hold more than one non-FIFA nationality.

No.	Pos.	Nation	Player
1	GK	POL	Filip Kurto
3	DF	NZL	Justin Gulley
4	MF	ESP	Mandi
5	DF	AUS	Ryan Lowry
7	FW	IRL	Cillian Sheridan
9	FW	AUS	Nathan Burns
11	FW	AUS	David Williams
12	DF	AUS	Antony Golec
13	DF	NZL	Liberato Cacace
14	MF	NZL	Alex Rufer
15	MF	POL	Michał Kopczyński

No.	Pos.	Nation	Player
16	DF	NZL	Louis Fenton
17	MF	NZL	Callan Elliot
18	MF	NZL	Sarpreet Singh
19	DF	NZL	Tom Doyle
20	GK	NZL	Oliver Sail
21	FW	FIJ	Roy Krishna
22	DF	NZL	Andrew Durante (captain)
23	MF	AUS	Max Burgess
27	DF	ENG	Steven Taylor
31	FW	NZL	Ben Waine (scholarship)
32	MF	AUS	Gianni Stensness (scholarship)

=== From youth squad ===
N	Pos.	Nat.	Name	Age	Notes
13	DF	(New Zealand)	Liberato Cacace	17	2-year professional contract
31	FW	(New Zealand)	Ben Waine	17	academy player
32	MF	(Australia)	Gianni Stensness	20	1-year professional contract

=== Transfers in ===
No.	Position	Player	Transferred from	Type/fee	Contract length	Date	Ref
27	DF	(England) Steven Taylor	(England) Peterborough United	Free transfer	1 year	10 July 2018	
1	GK	(Poland) Filip Kurto	(Netherlands) Roda JC	Free transfer	1 year	18 July 2018	
16	MF	Louis Fenton		Free transfer	1 year	22 July 2018	
8	MF	(Australia) Mitch Nichols		Free transfer	2 years	23 July 2018	
11	FW	(Australia) David Williams		Free transfer	1 year	23 July 2018	
15	MF	(Poland) Michał Kopczyński	(Poland) Legia Warsaw	Loan	1 year	25 July 2018	
23	MF	(Australia) Max Burgess	(Australia) Sydney Olympic	Free transfer	1 year	11 October 2018	
4	MF	(Spain) Mandi	(Spain) Almería	Free transfer	1 year	12 October 2018	
3	MF	(Australia) Reuben Way	(Australia) Heidelberg United	Free transfer	1 year	17 October 2018	
17	MF	Callan Elliot	(New Zealand) Tasman United	Free transfer	1 year	17 October 2018	
40	GK	(Australia) Ante Covic		Injury replacement	1 week	6 December 2018	
7	FW	(Republic of Ireland) Cillian Sheridan		Free transfer	1 year	3 January 2019	
3	DF	Justin Gulley	(New Zealand) Team Wellington	Free transfer		29 January 2019	
12	DF	Antony Golec	Central Coast Mariners	Free transfer	1 year	30 January 2019	

=== Transfers out ===
No.	Position	Player	Transferred to	Type/fee	Date	Ref
13	DF	(Italy) Marco Rossi		Free transfer	18 April 2018	
10	MF	Michael McGlinchey		Mutual contract termination	1 May 2018	
30	GK	Keegan Smith	(New Zealand) Lower Hutt City	Free transfer	4 May 2018	
23	MF	Matthew Ridenton	Newcastle Jets	Free transfer	9 May 2018	
8	MF	(Serbia) Matija Ljujić	(Portugal) Belenenses	Mutual contract termination	1 June 2018	
4	MF	(Croatia) Goran Paracki		End of contract	13 June 2018	
9	FW	(Serbia) Andrija Kaluđerović		End of contract	13 June 2018	
40	GK	(Australia) Tando Velaphi	Perth Glory	Free transfer	2 July 2018	
15	MF	James McGarry	(Netherlands) Willem II	Free transfer	12 July 2018	
24	FW	Logan Rogerson	(Germany) Carl Zeiss Jena	Free transfer	18 July 2018	
1	GK	(Australia) Lewis Italiano	(Australia) Stirling Lions	Free transfer	19 July 2018	
12	MF	(Australia) Adam Parkhouse		Mutual contract termination	20 July 2018	
40	GK	(Australia) Ante Covic			13 December 2018	
8	MF	(Australia) Mitch Nichols		Mutual contract termination	15 January 2019	
3	DF	(Australia) Reuben Way			15 January 2019	
6	DF	(Australia) Dylan Fox		Mutual contract termination	13 March 2019	

=== Contract extensions ===
No.	Name	Position	Duration	Date	Notes
22	Andrew Durante	Central defender	1 year	18 May 2018	
14	Alex Rufer	Midfielder	1 year	6 August 2018	
27	(England) Steven Taylor	Defender	1 year	18 February 2019	
16	Louis Fenton	Full-back	2 years	22 February 2019	
14	Alex Rufer	Midfielder	1 year	27 February 2019	
20	Oliver Sail	Goalkeeper	2 years	5 April 2019	
17	Callan Elliot	Attacking midfielder	1 year	24 April 2019	

== Technical staff ==
Position	Name
Head coach	(Australia) Marko Rudan
Assistant coach	(England) Chris Greenacre
Goalkeeping coach	(England) Paul Gothard
Reserves team coach	(England) Steve Coleman
Strength & Conditioning coach	(New Zealand) Aidan Wivell

== Squad statistics ==
=== Appearances and goals ===
N	Pos.	Nat.	Name	Total					A-League					FFA Cup
N	Pos.	Nat.	Name	Apps	Goals	Yellow card	Second yellow card	Red card	Apps	Goals	Yellow card	Second yellow card	Red card	Apps	Goals	Yellow card	Second yellow card	Red card
1	GK	(Poland)	Filip Kurto	23	0	0	0	0	22+0	0	0	0	0	1+0	0	0	0	0
3	DF	(New Zealand)	Justin Gulley	0	0	0	0	0	0+0	0	0	0	0	0+0	0	0	0	0
4	MF	(Spain)	Mandi	21	2	3	0	1	21+0	2	3	0	1	0+0	0	0	0	0
5	DF	(Australia)	Ryan Lowry	10	0	2	0	1	4+5	0	2	0	1	1+0	0	0	0	0
7	FW	(Republic of Ireland)	Cillian Sheridan	13	1	2	0	0	1+12	1	2	0	0	0+0	0	0	0	0
9	FW	(Australia)	Nathan Burns	11	0	1	0	0	6+4	0	1	0	0	1+0	0	0	0	0
11	FW	(Australia)	David Williams	23	11	1	0	0	18+5	11	1	0	0	0+0	0	0	0	0
12	DF	(Australia)	Antony Golec	5	0	2	0	0	4+1	0	2	0	0	0+0	0	0	0	0
13	MF	(New Zealand)	Liberato Cacace	23	1	3	0	0	22+0	1	3	0	0	1+0	0	0	0	0
14	MF	(New Zealand)	Alex Rufer	23	0	10	0	0	21+1	0	10	0	0	0+1	0	0	0	0
15	MF	(Poland)	Michał Kopczyński	20	0	1	0	0	14+5	0	1	0	0	1+0	0	0	0	0
16	DF	(New Zealand)	Louis Fenton	22	3	4	0	0	22+0	3	4	0	0	0+0	0	0	0	0
17	MF	(New Zealand)	Callan Elliot	2	0	0	0	0	0+2	0	0	0	0	0+0	0	0	0	0
18	MF	(New Zealand)	Sarpreet Singh	23	5	5	0	0	20+2	5	5	0	0	1+0	0	0	0	0
19	DF	(New Zealand)	Tom Doyle	16	0	4	0	0	13+2	0	4	0	0	0+1	0	0	0	0
20	GK	(New Zealand)	Oliver Sail	3	0	2	0	0	2+1	0	2	0	0	0+0	0	0	0	0
21	FW	(Fiji)	Roy Krishna	24	15	5	1	0	23+0	15	5	1	0	1+0	0	0	0	0
22	DF	(New Zealand)	Andrew Durante	24	0	7	0	0	23+0	0	7	0	0	1+0	0	0	0	0
23	MF	(Australia)	Max Burgess	19	0	2	0	0	4+15	0	2	0	0	0+0	0	0	0	0
27	DF	(England)	Steven Taylor	19	1	4	0	0	18+0	1	4	0	0	1+0	0	0	0	0
31	FW	(New Zealand)	Ben Waine†	2	0	0	0	0	0+1	0	0	0	0	0+1	0	0	0	0
32	MF	(Australia)	Gianni Stensness†	3	0	0	0	0	0+3	0	0	0	0	0+0	0	0	0	0
Players no longer at the club:
3	DF	(Australia)	Reuben Way	1	0	0	0	0	0+1	0	0	0	0	0+0	0	0	0	0
6	DF	(Australia)	Dylan Fox	7	0	0	0	0	3+3	0	0	0	0	1+0	0	0	0	0
8	MF	(Australia)	Mitch Nichols	8	0	1	0	0	3+4	0	1	0	0	1+0	0	0	0	0
40	GK	(Australia)	Ante Čović	0	0	0	0	0	0+0	0	0	0	0	0+0	0	0	0	0

- Last updated: 7 April 2019
- Source: au.soccerway.com
- (yellow card) = Number of bookings; (second yellow card) = Number of sending offs after a second yellow card; (red card) = Number of sending offs by a direct red card.

† = Scholarship or reserves-listed player

== Pre-season and friendlies ==
11 July 2018 Friendly	Wellington Phoenix (New Zealand)	2–1	(New Zealand) Miramar Rangers	Lower Hutt, New Zealand
	Singh; Sinclair		Allen	Stadium: Memorial Park

18 July 2018 Friendly	Wairarapa United (New Zealand)	0–1	(New Zealand) Wellington Phoenix	Masterton, New Zealand
		Report	Singh	Stadium: Trust House Memorial Park

31 July 2018 Friendly	Wellington Phoenix (New Zealand)	1–2	(Australia) Brisbane Roar	Gold Coast, Australia
	Burns		Bauthéac; Taggart	Stadium: Cbus Super Stadium; Referee: Chris Beath

18 August 2018 Friendly	Wellington Phoenix (New Zealand)	5–0	(New Zealand) Lower Hutt City	Wellington, New Zealand
12:00 NZDT	(?); Taylor (?); Singh (?); Krishna (?)	Report		Stadium: Martin Luckie Park

25 August 2018 Friendly	Napier City Rovers (New Zealand)	0–5	(New Zealand) Wellington Phoenix	Palmerston North, New Zealand
12:00 NZDT		Report	Burns; Krishna; Yoo; Doyle; Krishna	Stadium: Central Energy Trust Arena

1 September 2018 Friendly	Central League Select XI (New Zealand)	0–2	(New Zealand) Wellington Phoenix	Raumati Beach, New Zealand
14:00 NZDT		Report	Krishna; Burns	Stadium: Weka Park

23 September 2018	Western Sydney Wanderers (Australia)	1–0	(New Zealand) Wellington Phoenix	Sydney, Australia
	Fitzgerald 20'	Report		Stadium: Marconi Stadium; Attendance: 3,000

29 September 2018	Sydney FC (Australia)	2–1	(New Zealand) Wellington Phoenix	Sydney, Australia
11:30	Le Fondre (?); Calver 73'	Report	Krishna (?)	Stadium: Macquarie University Sports Fields; Attendance: 0 (behind closed doors); Referee: Kurt Ams

6 October 2018	Wellington Phoenix (New Zealand)	3–1	(Australia) Melbourne Victory	Melbourne, Australia
	Krishna (?)	Report	Honda (?)	Stadium: AAMI Park

== Competitions ==
=== Overall ===
Competition	Started round	Final position / round	First match	Last match
A-League	—	6th	21 October 2018	28 April 2019
A-League Finals	Elimination-finals	Elimination-finals	3 May 2019	3 May 2019
FFA Cup	Round of 32	Round of 32	7 August 2018	7 August 2018

=== A-League ===
==== League table ====
Pos	Team	Pld	W	D	L	GF	GA	GD	Pts	Qualification
1	Perth Glory	27	18	6	3	56	23	+33	60	Qualification for 2020 AFC Champions League group stage and Finals series (Note: The top two teams enter the Finals series at the semi-finals, while the teams ranked third to sixth enter the Finals series at the elimination-finals.)
2	Sydney FC (C)	27	16	4	7	43	29	+14	52	Qualification for 2020 AFC Champions League group stage and Finals series
3	Melbourne Victory	27	15	5	7	50	32	+18	50	Qualification for 2020 AFC Champions League preliminary round 2 and Finals series
4	Adelaide United	27	12	8	7	37	32	+5	44	Qualification for Finals series
5	Melbourne City	27	11	7	9	39	32	+7	40	Qualification for Finals series
6	Wellington Phoenix (Note: Wellington Phoenix cannot qualify for the AFC Champions League as they are not recognised as an AFC club.)	27	11	7	9	46	43	+3	40	Qualification for Finals series
7	Newcastle Jets	27	10	5	12	40	36	+4	35	
8	Western Sydney Wanderers	27	6	6	15	42	54	−12	24	
9	Brisbane Roar	27	4	6	17	38	71	−33	18	
10	Central Coast Mariners	27	3	4	20	31	70	−39	13	

Source: A-Leagues
Rules for classification: 1) points; 2) goal difference; 3) number of goals scored.
(C) Champions

==== Results summary ====
Overall								Home						Away					
Pld	W	D	L	GF	GA	GD	Pts	W	D	L	GF	GA	GD	W	D	L	GF	GA	GD
27	11	7	9	46	43	+3	40	8	2	3	25	17	+8	3	5	6	21	26	−5

Last updated: 7 April 2019.
Source: ultimatealeauge.com

==== Results by round ====
Round	1	2	3	4	5	6	7	8	9	10	11	12	13	14	15	16	17	18	19	20	21	22	23	24	25	26	27
Ground	H	A	H	A	H	H	A	H	H	A	A	A	H	A	H	H	A	A	H	H	A	H	H	A	A	H	A
Result	W	D	L	L	L	D	W	W	W	D	D	W	W	D	L	W	L	D	D	L	W	W	W	L	L	W	L
Position	1	4	4	7	9	9	8	6	5	4	6	5	5	5	6	5	6	6	6	6	4	4	4	4	5	5	6

Updated to match(es) played on 7 April 2019. Source: ultimatealeague.com
A = Away; H = Home; W = Win; D = Draw; L = Loss

==== Matches ====
Win Draw Loss

21 October 2018 1	Wellington Phoenix	2–1	Newcastle Jets	Wellington
17:00 NZDT	Georgievski 32' (o.g.); Krishna 90'	Report	D. Petratos 90+5'	Stadium: Westpac Stadium; Attendance: 9,174; Referee: Daniel Elder

28 October 2018 2	Brisbane Roar	0–0	Wellington Phoenix	Brisbane
16:00 AEST		Report		Stadium: Suncorp Stadium; Attendance: 15,129; Referee: Alex King

3 November 2018 3	Wellington Phoenix	0–3	Western Sydney Wanderers	Wellington
19:35 NZDT		Report	Baumjohann 11'; Riera 55' (pen.); O'Doherty 90+2'	Stadium: Westpac Stadium; Attendance: 5,339; Referee: Jarred Gillett

9 November 2018 4	Melbourne City	2–0	Wellington Phoenix	Melbourne
19:50 AEDT	De Laet 9'; Fornaroli 59'	Report		Stadium: AAMI Park; Attendance: 6,041; Referee: Adam Fielding

24 November 2018 5	Wellington Phoenix	1–3	Adelaide United	Wellington
19:35 NZDT	Mandi 14'	Report	Doyle 45' (o.g.); Ilsø 47', 64'	Stadium: Westpac Stadium; Attendance: 4,831; Referee: Kurt Ams

2 December 2018 6	Wellington Phoenix	1–1	Perth Glory	Wellington
19:00 NZDT	Krishna 44'	Report	Castro 82'	Stadium: Westpac Stadium; Attendance: 4,829; Referee: Adam Kersey

8 December 2018 7	Sydney FC	1–3	Wellington Phoenix	Sydney
17:35 AEDT	Zullo 89'	Report	Krishna 21', 30'; Taylor 38'	Stadium: Jubilee Stadium; Attendance: 10,101; Referee: Jonathan Barreiro

15 December 2018 8	Wellington Phoenix	2–0	Central Coast Mariners	Wellington
19:35 NZDT	Fenton 9'; Singh 45'	Report		Stadium: Westpac Stadium; Attendance: 6,970; Referee: Shaun Evans

22 December 2018 9	Wellington Phoenix	4–1	Brisbane Roar	Wellington
19:35 NZDT	Papadopoulos 35' (o.g.); Williams 75'; Krishna 80' (pen.); Singh 90+3'	Report	Henrique 45+1'	Stadium: Westpac Stadium; Attendance: 6,841; Referee: Kurt Ams

28 December 2018 10	Melbourne Victory	1–1	Wellington Phoenix	Melbourne
19:50 AEST	Toivonen 77'	Report	Williams 62'	Stadium: AAMI Park; Attendance: 20,066; Referee: Daniel Elder

5 January 2019 11	Adelaide United	0–0	Wellington Phoenix	Adelaide
17:05 ACDT		Report		Stadium: Coopers Stadium; Attendance: 8,954; Referee: Stephen Lucas

8 January 2019 12	Western Sydney Wanderers	2–3	Wellington Phoenix	Sydney
19:50 AEDT	Hamill 42'; Baccus 84'	Report	Fenton 36'; Krishna 82', 89'	Stadium: ANZ Stadium; Attendance: 7,228; Referee: Jonathan Barreiro

12 January 2019 13	Wellington Phoenix	3–2	Central Coast Mariners	Wellington
19:35 NZDT	Krishna 48' (pen.), 58' (pen.); Williams 65'	Report	Simon 8' (pen.); Hoole 21'	Stadium: Westpac Stadium; Attendance: 10,186; Referee: Alex King

20 January 2019 14	Melbourne Victory	3–3	Wellington Phoenix	Melbourne
17:00 AEST	Toivonen 5'; Troisi 56'; Barbarouses 88'	Report	Williams 7'; Krishna 20' (pen.), 28'	Stadium: AAMI Park; Attendance: 18,136; Referee: Jarred Gillett

23 January 2019 15	Wellington Phoenix	0–1	Sydney FC	Wellington
19:35 NZDT		Report	de Jong 25'	Stadium: Westpac Stadium; Attendance: 8,961; Referee: Daniel Elder

26 January 2019 16	Wellington Phoenix	1–0	Melbourne City	Wellington
19:35 NZDT	Williams 5'	Report		Stadium: Westpac Stadium; Attendance: 8,554; Referee: Jonathan Barreiro

2 February 2019 17	Perth Glory	3–0	Wellington Phoenix	Perth
19:00 AWST	Lowry 19'; Ikonomidis 35'; Keogh 64'	Report		Stadium: HBF Park; Attendance: 9,148; Referee: Shaun Evans

7 February 2019 18	Newcastle Jets	1–1	Wellington Phoenix	Newcastle
19:50 AEDT	Vargas 33'	Report	Williams 58'	Stadium: McDonald Jones Stadium; Attendance: 7,394; Referee: Stephan Lucas

15 February 2019 19	Wellington Phoenix	1–1	Melbourne Victory	Auckland
19:35 NZDT	Krishna 57'	Report	Honda 67' (pen.)	Stadium: Eden Park; Attendance: 23,648; Referee: Peter Green

23 February 2019 20	Wellington Phoenix	0–1	Sydney FC	Sydney
19:35 NZDT		Report	Le Fondre 65' (pen.)	Stadium: Campbelltown Stadium; Attendance: 5,115; Referee: Shaun Evans

9 March 2019 21	Central Coast Mariners	2–8	Wellington Phoenix	Gosford
19:50 AEDT	Clisby 61'; Mallon 69'	Report	Graham 8' (o.g.); Krishna 12', 45+1'; Williams 21'; Cacace 51'; Fenton 59'; Singh 57', 88'	Stadium: Central Coast Stadium; Attendance: 3,703; Referee: Chris Beath

17 March 2019 22	Wellington Phoenix	3–1	Western Sydney Wanderers	Wellington
19:00 NZDT	Krishna 12'; Mandi 23'; Williams 33'	Report	Duke 86'	Stadium: Westpac Stadium; Attendance: 7,685; Referee: Alex King

30 March 2019 23	Wellington Phoenix	4–1	Newcastle Jets	Wellington
19:35 NZDT	Williams 1', 60', 65' (pen.); Singh 73'	Report	O'Donovan 62'	Stadium: Westpac Stadium; Attendance: 9,028; Referee: Matthew Conger

7 April 2019 24	Adelaide United	3–1	Wellington Phoenix	Adelaide
16:30 ACDT	Marrone 10'; Stamatelopoulos 17', 44'	Report	Sheridan 73'	Stadium: Coopers Stadium; Attendance: 8,343; Referee: Jonathan Barreiro

12 April 2019 25	Brisbane Roar	2–1	Wellington Phoenix	Brisbane
19:50 AEST	Bauthéac 37', 42'	Report	Taylor 53'	Stadium: Suncorp Stadium; Attendance: 6,084; Referee: Peter Green

21 April 2019 26	Wellington Phoenix	3–2	Melbourne City	Wellington
19:35 NZDT	Krishna 27', 51', 90+4'	Report	McGree 42', 66'	Stadium: Westpac Stadium; Attendance: 8,294; Referee: Shaun Evans

28 April 2019 27	Perth Glory	5–0	Wellington Phoenix	Perth
17:00 AWST	Keogh 24', 31'; Castro 51'; Ikonomidis 65'; Santalab 83'	Report		Stadium: HBF Park; Attendance: 9,875; Referee: Stephen Lucas

==== Finals series ====
3 May 2019 Elimination-final	Melbourne Victory	3–1	Wellington Phoenix	Melbourne
19:50 AEST	Niedermeier 42'; Toivonen 53'; Barbarouses 71'	Report	Krishna 64'	Stadium: AAMI Park; Attendance: 16,010; Referee: Shaun Evans

=== FFA Cup ===
7 August 2018 Round of 32	Bentleigh Greens (Victoria (state))	1–0	(New Zealand) Wellington Phoenix	Melbourne
19:30 AEST	Jankovic 23'	Report		Stadium: Kingston Heath Soccer Complex; Attendance: 1283
