= 2017–18 Wellington Phoenix FC season =

Wellington Phoenix
2017–18 season
- Chairman: Rob Morrison
- Manager: Darije Kalezić (to 7 March 2018); Chris Greenacre (caretaker) (from 7 March 2018)
- Stadium: Westpac Stadium, Wellington
- A-League: 9th
- ISPS Handa Premiership: 9th
- FFA Cup: Round of 32
- Top goalscorer: Andrija Kaluđerović (9 goals)
- Highest home attendance: 8,154 vs Adelaide United; 8 October 2017
- Lowest home attendance: 4,312 vs Melbourne City; 14 April 2018
- Average home league attendance: 5,694
Home colours	Away colours	Third colours

The 2017–18 Wellington Phoenix FC season was the club's 11th season since its establishment in 2007. The club participated in the A-League for the 11th time, the FFA Cup for the fourth time, and fielded a reserves squad in the ISPS Handa Premiership for the fourth time.

== Players ==
=== Squad information ===
Note: Flags indicate national team as defined under FIFA eligibility rules; some limited exceptions apply. Players may hold more than one non-FIFA nationality.

No.	Pos.	Nation	Player
1	GK	AUS	Lewis Italiano
2	DF	AUS	Daniel Mullen
3	DF	AUS	Scott Galloway
4	MF	CRO	Goran Paracki
5	DF	AUS	Ryan Lowry
6	DF	AUS	Dylan Fox
7	FW	AUS	Nathan Burns
8	MF	SRB	Matija Ljujić
9	FW	SRB	Andrija Kaluđerović
10	MF	NZL	Michael McGlinchey
12	MF	AUS	Adam Parkhouse
13	DF	ITA	Marco Rossi

No.	Pos.	Nation	Player
14	MF	NZL	Alex Rufer
15	MF	NZL	James McGarry
17	FW	NZL	Monty Patterson (on loan from Ipswich Town)
18	MF	NZL	Sarpreet Singh
19	DF	NZL	Tom Doyle
20	GK	NZL	Oliver Sail
21	FW	FIJ	Roy Krishna
22	DF	NZL	Andrew Durante (Captain)
23	MF	NZL	Matthew Ridenton
24	FW	NZL	Logan Rogerson (Youth)
30	GK	NZL	Keegan Smith (Youth)
40	GK	AUS	Tando Velaphi

=== From youth squad ===
N	Pos.	Nat.	Name	Age	Notes
18	MF	(New Zealand)	Sarpreet Singh	18	
30	GK	(New Zealand)	Keegan Smith	18	

=== Transfers in ===
No.	Position	Player	Transferred from	Type/fee	Contract length	Date	Ref
1	GK	(Australia) Lewis Italiano	(Australia) Bulleen Lions	Free transfer	1 year	10 June 2017	
3	DF	(Australia) Scott Galloway		Free transfer	1 year	29 June 2017	
4	MF	(Croatia) Goran Paracki	(Croatia) Istra 1961	Free transfer	1 year	20 July 2017	
8	MF	(Australia) Dario Vidošić		Free transfer	1 year	4 August 2017	
2	DF	(Australia) Daniel Mullen		Free transfer	1 year	9 August 2017	
9	FW	(Serbia) Andrija Kaluđerović		Free transfer	1 year	15 August 2017	
17	DF	(Iraq) Ali Abbas		Injury replacement	2 years	22 August 2017	
7	FW	(Australia) Nathan Burns	(Japan) Sanfrecce Hiroshima	Free transfer	2 years	30 December 2017	
8	MF	(Serbia) Matija Ljujić		Free transfer	6 months	9 January 2018	
17	FW	Monty Patterson	(England) Ipswich Town	Loan	6 months	31 January 2018	
40	GK	(Australia) Tando Velaphi		Free transfer	6 months	1 February 2018	

=== Transfers out ===
No.	Position	Player	Transferred to	Type/fee	Date	Ref
1	GK	Glen Moss	Newcastle Jets	Free transfer	15 May 2017	
4	MF	(Curaçao) Roly Bonevacia	Western Sydney Wanderers	Free transfer	16 May 2017	
20	GK	(Australia) Lewis Italiano	(Australia) Bulleen Lions	Free transfer	17 May 2017	
8	MF	(Spain) Alex Rodriguez	(Portugal) Boavista	Free transfer	6 June 2017	
9	FW	Kosta Barbarouses		Mutual contract termination	13 June 2017	
17	MF	(Australia) Vince Lia	Adelaide United	Free transfer	3 August 2017	
16	MF	Louis Fenton	(New Zealand) Team Wellington	Free transfer	12 September 2017	
7	MF	(Brazil) Guilherme Finkler		Mutual contract termination	8 December 2017	
8	MF	(Australia) Dario Vidošić		Mutual contract termination	20 December 2017	
11	FW	Hamish Watson		Mutual contract termination	24 January 2018	
27	MF	Liam Wood	(New Zealand) Team Wellington	Mutual contract termination	24 January 2018	
29	DF	Luke Tongue	(New Zealand) Canterbury United	Mutual contract termination	24 January 2018	
17	DF	(Iraq) Ali Abbas		Mutual contract termination	31 January 2018	

=== Contract extensions ===
No.	Name	Position	Duration	Date	Notes
5	(Australia) Ryan Lowry	Central defender	2 years	1 June 2017	
11	Hamish Watson	Striker	2 years	1 June 2017	
21	(Fiji) Roy Krishna	Striker	1 year	15 February 2018	

== Technical staff ==
Position	Name
Head coach	(England) Chris Greenacre (Caretaker)
Assistant coach	(New Zealand) Paul Temple
Goalkeeping coach	(Angola) Fernando vaz Alves
Reserves team coach	(England) Steve Coleman
Strength & Conditioning coach	(New Zealand) Aidan Wivell

== Statistics ==
=== Squad statistics ===
N	Pos.	Nat.	Name	Total					A-League					FFA Cup					ISPS Handa Premiership
N	Pos.	Nat.	Name	Apps	Goals	Yellow card	Second yellow card	Red card	Apps	Goals	Yellow card	Second yellow card	Red card	Apps	Goals	Yellow card	Second yellow card	Red card	Apps	Goals	Yellow card	Second yellow card	Red card
1	GK	(Australia)	Lewis Italiano	16	0	1	0	0	13+0	0	1	0	0	1+0	0	0	0	0	2+0	0	0	0	0
2	DF	(Australia)	Daniel Mullen	18	1	2	0	0	17+1	1	2	0	0	0+0	0	0	0	0	0+0	0	0	0	0
3	DF	(Australia)	Scott Galloway	22	0	4	0	0	18+3	0	4	0	0	1+0	0	0	0	0	0+0	0	0	0	0
4	MF	(Croatia)	Goran Paracki	25	1	6	0	0	23+1	1	5	0	0	1+0	0	1	0	0	0+0	0	0	0	0
5	DF	(Australia)	Ryan Lowry	4	1	0	1	0	0+0	0	0	0	0	0+0	0	0	0	0	4+0	1	0	1	0
6	DF	(Australia)	Dylan Fox	15	0	4	0	0	11+3	0	3	0	0	0+0	0	0	0	0	1+0	0	1	0	0
7	FW	(Australia)	Nathan Burns	14	0	1	0	0	11+3	0	1	0	0	0+0	0	0	0	0	0+0	0	0	0	0
8	MF	(Serbia)	Matija Ljujić	13	2	4	0	0	10+3	2	4	0	0	0+0	0	0	0	0	0+0	0	0	0	0
9	MF	(Serbia)	Andrija Kaluđerović	22	9	1	0	0	21+1	9	1	0	0	0+0	0	0	0	0	0+0	0	0	0	0
10	MF	(New Zealand)	Michael McGlinchey	21	0	3	0	0	15+5	0	2	0	0	1+0	0	1	0	0	0+0	0	0	0	0
12	MF	(Australia)	Adam Parkhouse	22	0	2	0	0	5+13	0	2	0	0	1+0	0	0	0	0	3+0	0	0	0	0
13	DF	(Italy)	Marco Rossi	15	0	5	0	0	14+1	0	5	0	0	0+0	0	0	0	0	0+0	0	0	0	0
14	MF	(New Zealand)	Alex Rufer	16	1	3	0	1	4+7	0	2	0	1	1+0	0	0	0	0	4+0	1	1	0	0
15	MF	(New Zealand)	James McGarry	13	4	1	0	0	0+0	0	0	0	0	0+0	0	0	0	0	13+0	4	1	0	0
17	FW	(New Zealand)	Monty Patterson	6	1	1	0	0	2+2	0	0	0	0	0+0	0	0	0	0	2+0	1	1	0	0
18	MF	(New Zealand)	Sarpreet Singh	18	8	5	0	0	6+4	4	2	0	0	1+0	0	0	0	0	7+0	4	3	0	0
19	DF	(New Zealand)	Tom Doyle	20	0	5	0	0	18+1	0	4	0	0	1+0	0	1	0	0	0+0	0	0	0	0
20	GK	(New Zealand)	Oliver Sail	13	0	1	0	0	3+0	0	0	0	0	0+0	0	0	0	0	10+0	0	1	0	0
21	FW	(Fiji)	Roy Krishna	21	4	2	0	0	18+2	4	2	0	0	1+0	0	0	0	0	0+0	0	0	0	0
22	DF	(New Zealand)	Andrew Durante	18	0	5	0	0	18+0	0	5	0	0	0+0	0	0	0	0	0+0	0	0	0	0
23	MF	(New Zealand)	Matthew Ridenton	25	0	4	0	0	23+2	0	4	0	0	0+0	0	0	0	0	0+0	0	0	0	0
24	FW	(New Zealand)	Logan Rogerson	19	6	4	0	0	1+6	1	0	0	0	1+0	0	0	0	0	11+0	5	4	0	0
30	GK	(New Zealand)	Keegan Smith	10	0	1	0	0	6+0	0	1	0	0	0+0	0	0	0	0	4+0	0	0	0	0
40	GK	(Australia)	Tando Velaphi	5	0	0	0	0	4+0	0	0	0	0	0+0	0	0	0	0	1+0	0	0	0	0
ISPS Handa Premiership contracted players:
2	MF	(New Zealand)	Pranay Singh	0	0	0	0	0	0+0	0	0	0	0	0+0	0	0	0	0	0+0	0	0	0	0
3	DF	(New Zealand)	Jake Williams	11	0	1	0	0	0+0	0	0	0	0	0+0	0	0	0	0	10+1	0	1	0	0
4	DF	(New Zealand)	Liam Moore	13	0	0	0	0	0+0	0	0	0	0	0+0	0	0	0	0	10+3	0	0	0	0
7	FW	(New Zealand)	Gianni Bouzoukis	6	0	1	0	0	0+0	0	0	0	0	0+0	0	0	0	0	2+4	0	1	0	0
8	MF	(New Zealand)	Oliver Whyte	18	4	2	0	0	0+0	0	0	0	0	0+0	0	0	0	0	18+0	4	2	0	0
10	MF	(New Zealand)	Willem Ebbinge	14	2	1	0	0	0+0	0	0	0	0	0+0	0	0	0	0	13+1	2	1	0	0
11	MF	(New Zealand)	Sam Sutton	14	0	3	0	0	0+0	0	0	0	0	0+0	0	0	0	0	11+3	0	3	0	0
12	DF	(New Zealand)	Oliver Valentine	7	0	0	0	0	0+0	0	0	0	0	0+0	0	0	0	0	3+4	0	0	0	0
19	DF	(New Zealand)	Sam Philip	16	0	2	0	0	0+0	0	0	0	0	0+0	0	0	0	0	15+1	0	2	0	0
23	FW	(New Zealand)	Ben Waine	15	0	0	0	0	0+0	0	0	0	0	0+0	0	0	0	0	10+5	0	0	0	0
26	DF	(New Zealand)	Liberato Cacace	20	0	4	0	0	6+1	0	1	0	0	0+0	0	0	0	0	12+1	0	3	0	0
29	FW	(New Zealand)	Matthew Conroy	0	0	0	0	0	0+0	0	0	0	0	0+0	0	0	0	0	0+0	0	0	0	0
30	GK	(New Zealand)	Zac Jones	1	0	0	0	0	0+0	0	0	0	0	0+0	0	0	0	0	1+0	0	0	0	0
34	MF	(New Zealand)	Manyumow Achol	1	0	0	0	0	0+0	0	0	0	0	0+0	0	0	0	0	0+1	0	0	0	0
38	DF	(New Zealand)	Jacob Masseurs	0	0	0	0	0	0+0	0	0	0	0	0+0	0	0	0	0	0+0	0	0	0	0
	MF	(New Zealand)	Oscar Browne	3	0	0	0	0	0+0	0	0	0	0	0+0	0	0	0	0	0+3	0	0	0	0
	MF	(New Zealand)	Noah Clegg-Tipene	5	0	0	0	0	0+0	0	0	0	0	0+0	0	0	0	0	4+1	0	0	0	0
	GK	(New Zealand)	Zachary Dean	0	0	0	0	0	0+0	0	0	0	0	0+0	0	0	0	0	0+0	0	0	0	0
	GK	(New Zealand)	Zac Jones	0	0	0	0	0	0+0	0	0	0	0	0+0	0	0	0	0	0+0	0	0	0	0
	MF	(New Zealand)	Jackson Manuel	2	0	0	0	0	0+0	0	0	0	0	0+0	0	0	0	0	0+2	0	0	0	0
	DF	(England)	Kurtis Mogg	5	0	0	0	0	0+0	0	0	0	0	0+0	0	0	0	0	5+0	0	0	0	0
	DF	(New Zealand)	Owen Smith	5	0	2	0	0	0+0	0	0	0	0	0+0	0	0	0	0	2+3	0	2	0	0
	MF	(New Zealand)	Oscar Spragg	3	0	0	0	0	0+0	0	0	0	0	0+0	0	0	0	0	1+2	0	0	0	0
	FW	(New Zealand)	Maximilian Batchelor	1	0	0	0	0	0+0	0	0	0	0	0+0	0	0	0	0	0+1	0	0	0	0
Players no longer at the club:
7	MF	(Brazil)	Gui Finkler	4	1	0	0	0	3+1	1	0	0	0	0+0	0	0	0	0	0+0	0	0	0	0
8	MF	(Australia)	Dario Vidošić	10	4	0	0	0	10+0	4	0	0	0	0+0	0	0	0	0	0+0	0	0	0	0
11	FW	(New Zealand)	Hamish Watson	10	1	0	0	0	0+8	0	0	0	0	0+0	0	0	0	0	2+0	1	0	0	0
17	DF	(Iraq)	Ali Abbas	9	0	2	0	0	6+2	0	2	0	0	0+0	0	0	0	0	0+1	0	0	0	0
26	FW	(New Zealand)	Tinashe Marowa	1	0	0	0	0	0+0	0	0	0	0	0+1	0	0	0	0	0+0	0	0	0	0
27	MF	(New Zealand)	Liam Wood	12	1	1	0	0	0+0	0	0	0	0	1+0	0	0	0	0	11+0	1	1	0	0
29	DF	(New Zealand)	Luke Tongue	8	1	3	0	0	0+0	0	0	0	0	0+1	0	0	0	0	5+2	1	3	0	0

- Last updated: 14 April 2018
- Source: au.soccerway.com
- (yellow card) = Number of bookings; (second yellow card) = Number of sending offs after a second yellow card; (red card) = Number of sending offs by a direct red card.

== Pre-season and friendlies ==
25 July 2017	Western Suburbs (New Zealand)	0–0	(New Zealand) Wellington Phoenix	Porirua, New Zealand
19:30 NZST		Report		Stadium: Porirua Park

2 September 2017	Wellington Phoenix (New Zealand)	4–0	(New Zealand) Capital Football Select	Raumati Beach, New Zealand
14:00 NZST	Watson 11', 55'; Parkhouse 13'; Singh 44'	Report		Stadium: Weka Park

10 September 2017 Nix On Tour	Blacktown City (Australia)	2–1	(New Zealand) Wellington Phoenix	Sydney, Australia
12:00 AEST	Gibbs 24', 40' (pen.)	Report	Rufer 22'	Stadium: Lily Football Centre

12 September 2017 Nix On Tour	Central Coast Mariners (Australia)	1–0	(New Zealand) Wellington Phoenix	Lisarow, Australia
19:00 AEST	Pain 7'	Report		Stadium: Pluim Park; Attendance: 1,350; Referee: Stephen Lucas

16 September 2017 Nix On Tour	Newcastle Jets (Australia)	2–1	(New Zealand) Wellington Phoenix	Edgeworth, Australia
15:00 AEST	O'Donovan 28'; Champness 80'	Report	Kaluđerović 66'	Stadium: Jack McLaughlan Oval; Attendance: 1,254

23 September 2017	Team Wellington (New Zealand)	1–8	(New Zealand) Wellington Phoenix	Wellington, New Zealand
14:00 NZST	Kilkolly 3'	Report	Finkler 8'; Kaluđerović 23', 28'; Ridenton 45'; Krishna 53'; Parkhouse 56'; Rogerson 79'; Vidošić 80'	Stadium: Westpac Stadium; Referee: Matthew Conger

30 September 2017	Team Wellington (New Zealand)	1–3	(New Zealand) Wellington Phoenix	Wellington, New Zealand
12:00 NZST	Stevens 51'	Report	Singh 18'; Rogerson 12', 75'	Stadium: Martin Luckie Park

30 September 2017	Auckland City (New Zealand)	2–2	(New Zealand) Wellington Phoenix	Wellington, New Zealand
14:15 NZST	Tade 48'; De Vries 77'	Report	Vidošić 15'; Wood 89'	Stadium: Martin Luckie Park

== Competitions ==
=== Overall ===
Competition	Started round	Final position / round	First match	Last match
A-League	—	9th	8 October 2017	14 April 2018
FFA Cup	Round of 32	Round of 32	1 August 2017	1 August 2017
ISPS Handa Premiership	—	9th	23 October 2017	17 March 2018

=== A-League ===
==== League table ====
Pos	Team	Pld	W	D	L	GF	GA	GD	Pts	Qualification
1	Sydney FC	27	20	4	3	64	22	+42	64	Qualification for 2019 AFC Champions League group stage and Finals series
2	Newcastle Jets	27	15	5	7	57	37	+20	50	Qualification for 2019 AFC Champions League second preliminary round and Finals series
3	Melbourne City	27	13	4	10	41	33	+8	43	Qualification for Finals series
4	Melbourne Victory (C)	27	12	5	10	43	37	+6	41	Qualification for 2019 AFC Champions League group stage and Finals series
5	Adelaide United	27	11	6	10	36	38	−2	39	Qualification for Finals series
6	Brisbane Roar	27	10	5	12	33	40	−7	35	Qualification for Finals series
7	Western Sydney Wanderers	27	8	9	10	38	47	−9	33	
8	Perth Glory	27	10	2	15	37	50	−13	32	
9	Wellington Phoenix (Note: Wellington Phoenix cannot qualify for the AFC Champions League as they are not recognised as an AFC club.)	27	5	6	16	31	55	−24	21	
10	Central Coast Mariners	27	4	8	15	28	49	−21	20	

Source: A-Leagues
Rules for classification: 1) points; 2) goal difference; 3) number of goals scored.
(C) Champions

==== Results summary ====
Overall								Home						Away					
Pld	W	D	L	GF	GA	GD	Pts	W	D	L	GF	GA	GD	W	D	L	GF	GA	GD
27	5	6	16	31	55	−24	21	4	4	5	22	25	−3	1	2	11	9	30	−21

Last updated: 14 April 2018.
Source: ultimatealeague.com

==== Results by round ====
Round	1	2	3	4	5	6	7	8	9	10	11	12	13	14	15	16	17	18	19	20	21	22	23	24	25	26	27
Ground	H	A	A	H	A	H	A	H	H	A	A	H	A	A	H	H	A	H	A	H	A	A	H	H	A	A	H
Result	D	L	L	D	L	W	L	L	L	D	L	L	D	L	W	D	W	L	L	W	L	L	L	D	L	L	W
Position	5	6	7	7	10	7	10\10	10	10	10	10	10	10	10	10	10	10	10	10	10	10	10	10	10	10	10	9

Updated to match(es) played on 14 April 2018. Source: ultimatealeague.com
A = Away; H = Home; W = Win; D = Draw; L = Loss

==== Matches ====
8 October 2017 1	Wellington Phoenix	1–1	Adelaide United	Wellington
17:00 NZDT	Vidošić 5'	Report	Absalonsen 9'	Stadium: Westpac Stadium; Attendance: 8,154; Referee: Chris Beath

15 October 2017 2	Sydney FC	3–2	Wellington Phoenix	Sydney
19:00 AEDT	Bobô 29', 49'; Zullo 34'	Report	Kaluđerović 44'; Vidošić 60'	Stadium: Allianz Stadium; Attendance: 11,284; Referee: Kurt Ams

21 October 2017 3	Melbourne City	1–0	Wellington Phoenix	Melbourne
17:35 AEDT	McCormack 69'	Report		Stadium: AAMI Park; Attendance: 9,091; Referee: Jonathan Barreiro

28 October 2017 4	Wellington Phoenix	3–3	Brisbane Roar	Wellington
19:35 NZDT	Kaluđerović 1', 20'; Krishna 18'	Report	Maccarone 45', 82' (pen.); Papadopoulos 66'	Stadium: Westpac Stadium; Attendance: 7,018; Referee: Jarred Gillett

4 November 2017 5	Newcastle Jets	3–0	Wellington Phoenix	Newcastle
19:50 AEDT	O'Donovan 37', 45+1'; Nabbout 54'	Report		Stadium: McDonald Jones Stadium; Attendance: 6,258; Referee: Kris Griffiths-Jones

12 November 2017 6	Wellington Phoenix	5–2	Perth Glory	Wellington
16:30 NZDT	Vidošić 13'; Paracki 34'; Finkler 52'; Kaluđerović 74' (pen.), 87'	Report	Torres 9'; S. Lowry 47'	Stadium: Westpac Stadium; Attendance: 6,105; Referee: Kurt Ams

25 November 2017 8	Wellington Phoenix	1–4	Central Coast Mariners	Wellington
19:35 NZDT	Vidošić 71'	Report	Kaluđerović 39' (o.g.); De Silva 54'; Hoole 67'; Buhagiar 90+3'	Stadium: Westpac Stadium; Attendance: 5,679; Referee: Peter Green

3 December 2017 9	Wellington Phoenix	2–3	Melbourne Victory	Wellington
16:30 NZDT	Kaluđerović 29', 31'	Report	Berisha 54'; Paracki 57' (o.g.); Troisi 87'	Stadium: Westpac Stadium; Attendance: 5,765; Referee: Alex King

9 December 2017 10	Brisbane Roar	0–0	Wellington Phoenix	Gold Coast
16:35 AEST		Report		Stadium: Cbus Super Stadium; Attendance: 5,192; Referee: Shaun Evans

16 December 2017 11	Perth Glory	1–0	Wellington Phoenix	Perth
19:00 AWST	Castro 59'	Report		Stadium: nib Stadium; Attendance: 7,750; Referee: Jarred Gillett

23 December 2017 12	Wellington Phoenix	1–4	Sydney FC	Wellington
17:35 NZDT	Kaluđerović 40'	Report	Bobô 17', 58', 86'; Mierzejewski 25'	Stadium: Westpac Stadium; Attendance: 5,432; Referee: Chris Beath

31 December 2017 13	Central Coast Mariners	0–0	Wellington Phoenix	Gosford
19:00 AEDT		Report		Stadium: Central Coast Stadium; Attendance: 9,110; Referee: Daniel Elder

6 January 2018 14	Melbourne City	2–1	Wellington Phoenix	Melbourne
19:50 AEDT	McCormack 72', 80'	Report	Krishna 42'	Stadium: AAMI Park; Attendance: 5,207; Referee: Adam Kersey

10 January 2018 15	Wellington Phoenix	2–1	Melbourne Victory	Wellington
19:35 NZDT	Krishna 64'; Milligan 83' (o.g.)	Report	Barbarouses 40'	Stadium: Westpac Stadium; Attendance: 5,105; Referee: Matthew Conger

13 January 2018 16	Wellington Phoenix	1–1	Western Sydney Wanderers	Wellington
19:35 NZDT	Ljujić 75'	Report	Santalab 28'	Stadium: Westpac Stadium; Attendance: 5,634; Referee: Stephen Lucas

20 January 2018 17	Newcastle Jets	2–3	Wellington Phoenix	Newcastle
17:35 AEDT	Nabbout 48'; D. Petratos 86' (pen.)	Report	Ljujić 28'; Mullen 37'; Krishna 59'	Stadium: McDonald Jones Stadium; Attendance: 10,877; Referee: Jarred Gillett

27 January 2018 18	Wellington Phoenix	0–1	Adelaide United	Wellington
19:35 NZDT		Report	Blackwood 32'	Stadium: Westpac Stadium; Attendance: 6,746; Referee: Shaun Evans

2 February 2018 19	Sydney FC	4–0	Wellington Phoenix	Sydney
19:50 AEDT	Brosque 8'; Mierzejewski 14'; Ninković 74'; Carney 85'	Report		Stadium: Allianz Stadium; Attendance: 10,220; Referee: Kris Griffiths-Jones

11 February 2018 7	Western Sydney Wanderers	4–0	Wellington Phoenix	Sydney
19:00 AEDT	Riera 6'; Thwaite 63'; Ikonomidis 72'; Sotirio 82'	Report		Stadium: ANZ Stadium; Attendance: 7,127; Referee: Adam Fielding

17 February 2018 20	Wellington Phoenix	2–1	Perth Glory	Wellington
19:35 NZDT	Singh 3'; Lowry 90+2' (o.g.)	Report	Castro 36'	Stadium: Westpac Stadium; Attendance: 4,806; Referee: Alex King

23 February 2018 21	Central Coast Mariners	1–0	Wellington Phoenix	Gosford
19:50 AEDT	De Silva 45+1'	Report		Stadium: Central Coast Stadium; Attendance: 4,973; Referee: Kris Griffiths-Jones

10 March 2018 22	Western Sydney Wanderers	4–1	Wellington Phoenix	Sydney
19:50 AEDT	Santalab 40'; Hamill 68', 78'; Ikonomidis 90'	Report	Singh 42'	Stadium: Spotless Stadium; Attendance: 7,041; Referee: Adam Kersey

17 March 2018 23	Wellington Phoenix	0–1	Newcastle Jets	Auckland
19:35 NZDT		Report	Hoffman 43'	Stadium: QBE Stadium; Attendance: 4,672; Referee: Shaun Evans

25 March 2018 24	Wellington Phoenix	2–2	Brisbane Roar	Wellington
17:00 NZDT	Kaluđerović 53'; Rogerson 64'	Report	Holman 50'; Kristensen 68'	Stadium: Westpac Stadium; Attendance: 4,594; Referee: Daniel Elder

30 March 2018 25	Adelaide United	3–1	Wellington Phoenix	Adelaide
19:20 ACDT	Absalonsen 42'; Garuccio 61'; N. Konstandopoulos 63'	Report	Rogerson 84' (pen.)	Stadium: Coopers Stadium; Attendance: 11,738; Referee: Peter Green

8 April 2018 26	Melbourne Victory	2–1	Wellington Phoenix	Melbourne
17:00 AEST	George 83' (pen.); Athiu 87'	Report	Broxham 23' (o.g.)	Stadium: AAMI Park; Attendance: 13,182; Referee: Jarred Gillett

14 April 2018 27	Wellington Phoenix	2–1	Melbourne City	Auckland
19:35 NZST	Singh 33', 58'	Report	Fornaroli 20'	Stadium: QBE Stadium; Attendance: 4,312; Referee: Shaun Evans

=== FFA Cup ===
1 August 2017 Round of 32	Western Sydney Wanderers (New South Wales)	1–0 (a.e.t.)	(New Zealand) Wellington Phoenix	Sydney
19:30 AEST	Riera 120+1'	Report		Stadium: Campbelltown Stadium; Attendance: 3,189; Referee: Chris Kavanagh

=== ISPS Handa Premiership ===
==== League table ====
Pos	Team	Pld	W	D	L	GF	GA	GD	Pts	Qualification
1	Auckland City	18	12	4	2	41	12	+29	40	Qualification to the Champions League and Finals series
2	Team Wellington	18	11	4	3	39	20	+19	37	Qualification to the Finals series
3	Canterbury United	18	11	3	4	35	20	+15	36	Qualification to the Finals series
4	Eastern Suburbs	18	10	2	6	37	24	+13	32	Qualification to the Finals series
5	Tasman United	18	6	5	7	34	39	−5	23	
6	Southern United	18	6	6	6	28	27	+1	24	
7	Hawke's Bay United	18	5	4	9	21	36	−15	19	
8	Waitakere United	18	5	4	9	30	34	−4	19	
9	Wellington Phoenix Reserves	18	4	3	11	27	53	−26	15	
10	Hamilton Wanderers	18	1	3	14	23	49	−26	6	

Updated to match(es) played on 18 March 2018. Source: NZ Football

==== Results summary ====
Overall								Home						Away					
Pld	W	D	L	GF	GA	GD	Pts	W	D	L	GF	GA	GD	W	D	L	GF	GA	GD
18	4	3	11	27	53	−26	15	1	1	7	15	33	−18	3	2	4	12	20	−8

Last updated: 17 March 2018.
Source: soccerway.com

==== Results by round ====
Round	1	2	3	4	5	6	7	8	9	10	11	12	13	14	15	16	17	18
Ground	A	H	H	H	A	H	A	A	H	A	H	A	A	H	A	A	H	H
Result	D	L	L	L	L	D	W	D	W	L	L	W	L	L	L	W	L	L
Position	7	8	9	9	9	9	9	9	8	9	9	9	9	9	9	9	9	9

Updated to match(es) played on 17 March 2018. Source: soccerway.com
A = Away; H = Home; W = Win; D = Draw; L = Loss

==== Matches ====
23 October 2017 1	Hawke's Bay United	0–0	Wellington Phoenix	Napier
16:35 NZDT		Report		Stadium: Bluewater Stadium; Referee: Antony Riley

28 October 2017 2	Wellington Phoenix	2–5	Team Wellington	Wellington
14:00 NZDT	Rogerson 14', 84' (pen.)	Report	Bevin 22'; Jackson 38'; Stevens 55'; Kilkolly 81' (pen.); Hailemariam 90+4'	Stadium: David Farrington Park; Referee: Calvin Berg

5 November 2017 3	Wellington Phoenix	0–5	Waitakere United	Wellington
14:00 NZDT		Report	Ohtsuka 17'; Linderboom 35'; Shaw 40', 76'; Estay 88'	Stadium: David Farrington Park; Referee: Matthew Conger

11 February 2018 4	Wellington Phoenix	3–5	Canterbury United	Wellington
14:00 NZDT	Rogerson 1'; Ebbinge 10', 48'	Report	King 41'; Ogilvie 50' (pen.), 90+2'; Hoyle 59'; Schwarz 82'	Stadium: David Farrington Park; Referee: Allan Wilson

19 November 2017 5	Auckland City	4–0	Wellington Phoenix	Auckland
14:00 NZDT	Tade 39', 68'; Kim 65'; Tavano 66'	Report		Stadium: Kiwitea Street; Referee: Antony Riley

25 November 2017 6	Wellington Phoenix	2–2	Southern United	Wellington
16:45 NZDT	Rufer 9' (pen.); McGarry 46'	Report	Coughlan 72', 82'	Stadium: Westpac Stadium; Referee: Avnit Maharaj

3 December 2017 7	Tasman United	0–2	Wellington Phoenix	Nelson
14:00 NZDT		Report	Singh 31'; Rogerson 78' (pen.)	Stadium: Trafalgar Park; Referee: Robert Fleetham

9 December 2017 8	Eastern Suburbs	2–2	Wellington Phoenix	Auckland
14:00 NZDT	Lowry 65' (o.g.); Payne 80'	Report	McGarry 10'; Lowry 90+4'	Stadium: Bill McKinlay Park; Referee: Hayden McCabe

16 December 2017 9	Wellington Phoenix	3–1	Hamilton Wanderers	Wellington
13:00 NZDT	Tongue 53'; McGarry 82' (pen.); Whyte 88'	Report	Semmy 46'	Stadium: David Farrington Park; Referee: Hayden McCabe

7 January 2018 10	Team Wellington	4–1	Wellington Phoenix	Wellington
14:00 NZDT	Bevin 12'; Sinclair 14'; Hailemariam 35'; Fenton 43'	Report	Wood 32'	Stadium: David Farrington Park; Referee: Cory Mills

13 January 2018 11	Wellington Phoenix	2–3	Hawke's Bay United	Wellington
16:45 NZDT	Whyte 48'; Singh 61'	Report	Taye 23'; Hoy 47'; Thurston 53'	Stadium: Westpac Stadium

21 January 2018 12	Waitakere United	2–3	Wellington Phoenix	Auckland
Sunday, 14:00 NZDT	Cain 27'; Linderboom 42'	Report	Watson 28'; Collett 53' (o.g.); Whyte 84'	Stadium: The Trusts Arena; Referee: Antony Riley

28 January 2018 13	Canterbury United	3–2	Wellington Phoenix	Christchurch
Sunday, 14:00 NZDT	Nakamura 13'; Schwarz 73'; Terris 80'	Report	Singh 30', 49'	Stadium: English Park; Referee: Robert Fleetham

4 February 2018 14	Wellington Phoenix	1–7	Eastern Suburbs	Wellington
Sunday, 14:00 NZDT	Rogerson 45+1'	Report	de Jong 3', 59'; Built 36', 50'; Moore 65' (o.g.); Tieku 68'; Dyer 72'	Stadium: David Farrington Park; Referee: Ben O'Connell

18 February 2018 15	Southern United	4–0	Wellington Phoenix	Dunedin
14:00 NZDT	Ridsdale 15'; Ledwith 37'; Treadwell 49'; Ridden 89'	Report		Stadium: Sunnyvale Park; Referee: Cory Mills

24 February 2018 16	Hamilton Wanderers	1–2	Wellington Phoenix	Tauranga
14:00 NZDT	Riley 50'	Report	McGarry 45'; Pratt 77' (o.g.)	Stadium: Links Avenue; Referee: Anna-Marie Keighley

11 March 2018 17	Wellington Phoenix	2–3	Tasman United	Wellington
14:00 NZDT	Patterson 23' (pen.); Whyte 79'	Report	Kowal 11'; Ifill 26' (pen.), 90+2'	Stadium: David Farrington Park; Referee: Peter Linney

17 March 2018 18	Wellington Phoenix	0–2	Auckland City	Auckland
16:35 NZDT		Report	Tade 36', 41'	Stadium: QBE Stadium; Referee: Arnit Maharaj
