= Sarpreet Singh =

New Zealand footballer (born 1999)

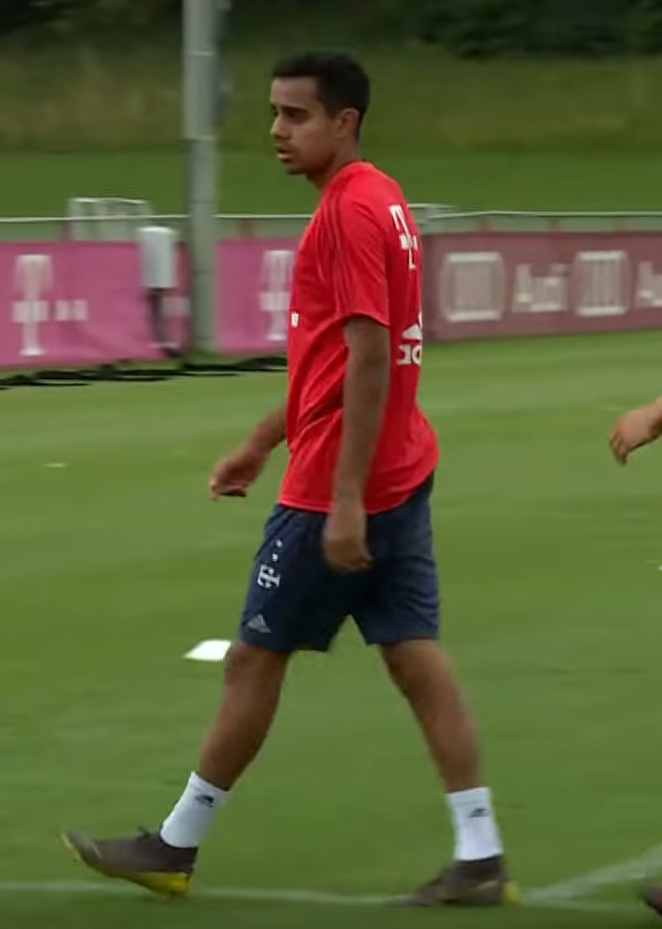
- Singh training with Bayern Munich in 2019

Personal information
- Full name: Sarpreet Singh
- Date of birth: 20 February 1999 (age 27)
- Place of birth: Auckland, New Zealand
- Height: 1.75 m (5 ft 9 in)
- Positions: Attacking midfielder; winger

Team information
- Current team: Farense
- Number: 9

Youth career
- 2004-2008: Papatoetoe
- 2008–2015: Onehunga Sports
- 2015–2017: Wellington Phoenix

Senior career*
Years	Team	Apps	(Gls)
2015–2018	Wellington Phoenix Reserves	34	(8)
2015–2019	Wellington Phoenix	39	(9)
2019–2022	Bayern Munich II	38	(10)
2019–2023	Bayern Munich	2	(0)
2020–2021	→ 1. FC Nürnberg (loan)	11	(0)
2021–2022	→ Jahn Regensburg (loan)	25	(6)
2022–2023	→ Jahn Regensburg (loan)	14	(1)
2023–2024	Hansa Rostock	15	(1)
2024–2025	União de Leiria	19	(4)
2025–2026	TSC	15	(2)
2026	→ Wellington Phoenix (loan)	2	(0)
2026–	Farense	7	(1)

International career^{‡}
2015	New Zealand U17	9	(0)
2016–2019	New Zealand U20	12	(1)
2024	New Zealand Olympic (O.P.)	3	(0)
2018–	New Zealand	31	(3)
- * Club domestic league appearances and goals as of 31 October 2026 ‡ National team caps and goals as of 27 June 2026

Sarpreet Singh (born 20 February 1999) is a New Zealand professional footballer who plays as an attacking midfielder for Farense and the New Zealand national team.

Singh played for Onehunga Sports in his youth before joining the Wellington Phoenix Academy in 2015, then making his competitive senior debut for the Wellington Phoenix in 2015. He spent four seasons with the club, becoming a regular starter and earning his first international call up for New Zealand in 2018 to play at the Intercontinental Cup, where he scored his first international goal.

After impressive performances with the New Zealand national under-20 football team at the 2019 FIFA U-20 World Cup, Singh signed a three-year deal with Bayern Munich. Singh's first appearance for the senior team was in a friendly against Arsenal at the 2019 International Champions Cup.

== Club career ==
=== Early career ===
Born in Auckland, New Zealand, Singh grew up playing for local club Onehunga Sports under the tutelage of long-term mentor Hiroshi Miyazawa. At the age of ten, Singh represented Auckland at the Australian National Futsal Championships, winning the most valuable player award and attracting interest from Premier League side Everton.

=== Wellington Phoenix ===
Singh joined the Wellington Phoenix Academy in early 2015 after impressing then-Phoenix coach Ernie Merrick, while playing for the New Zealand under-17 side at the OFC U-17 Championship. He was one of two players to receive a footballing scholarship to Scots College from New Zealand international Winston Reid.

Singh began his senior footballing career later that year, being placed into Wellington's reserve team in the New Zealand Football Championship at the age of 16. Singh made twelve appearances that season, with his season being marked by a call-up to the senior Wellington Phoenix squad for an A-League match against Perth Glory on 7 February 2016, where he remained an unused substitute. A year later, following much individual success for the reserves, Singh made his competitive debut in the A-League as a substitute in a 1–5 loss to Melbourne City on 18 February 2017. On 1 June 2017, Singh signed his first senior contract, penning a three-year deal with Wellington Phoenix.

Singh gained a consistent role in the Wellington Phoenix first team midway through the 2017–18 A-League season, making a series of substitute appearances under Darije Kalezić. Following a minor injury to Goran Paracki, Singh was named in the starting lineup for the first time on 17 February 2018 against Perth Glory. He marked his starting debut for the club with a long-range goal within three minutes in a 2–1 victory. Following this performance, Singh was promised a prolonged run in the starting eleven by Kalezić, and became a regular starter for the club; after two goals on the final matchday against Melbourne City, Singh finished the season as the second-highest goalscorer at the club behind Andrija Kaluđerović, despite only playing eleven games.

Singh carried his form into the 2018–19 season, becoming an undisputed starter under new coach Marko Rudan playing 26 games, scoring five goals and registering a team-high eight assists. Following a breakout performance in a 4–1 win over Brisbane Roar on 22 December 2018, in which Singh scored from a free kick and assisted a David Williams goal, he was described by critic Mark Bosnich as "the best player in the A-League right now at this moment in time".

=== Bayern Munich ===
After impressing Bayern scouts while playing for New Zealand at the 2019 FIFA U-20 World Cup, it was announced on 1 July 2019 Singh had signed a three-year deal with Bayern Munich for an undisclosed fee, believed to be between the figures of NZD $750,000 and $1,000,000. He was immediately assigned to their reserve team, Bayern Munich II, who play in the 3. Liga.

Singh made his friendly debut for the reserve side on 6 July 2019, assisting the opening goal as Bayern Munich II overcame FC Liefering 2–1. Singh made an appearance for the senior team eleven days later, playing the second half in a 2–1 friendly defeat to Arsenal in the 2019 International Champions Cup, and again in the other two tournament games against Real Madrid and AC Milan. Singh started his first game for Bayern Munich on 31 July, playing the full match and scoring in a penalty shoot-out loss to Tottenham Hotspur in the 2019 Audi Cup final. Singh's performance in the pre-season impressed Bayern Munich's coach Niko Kovač; on 3 August, he was called up for a 2–0 loss against Borussia Dortmund in the DFL Supercup, but was an unused substitute.

Singh scored his first goal for Bayern Munich II against Unterhaching in a 1–2 loss.

After impressing in the reserves with five goals and four assists, Singh was promoted to train with the first team until the end of the winter break by interim coach Hansi Flick. He subsequently made his Bundesliga debut for the senior team on 14 December 2019, coming on as a substitute for Philippe Coutinho in a 6–1 win over Werder Bremen. Singh became the first New Zealander to play in the Bundesliga since Oceania Footballer of the Century Wynton Rufer, who previously played for Werder Bremen.

Singh made his first start for Bayern Munich on 20 June 2020 against SC Freiburg after the club had secured the Bundesliga title.

In early June 2022, it was reported that Singh was close to signing a deal with newly promoted Bundesliga side Werder Bremen for a transfer fee of around €400,000. However, on 12 June, Werder Bremen opted against completion of this transfer, citing a significant case of osteitis pubis suffered in March.

==== 1. FC Nürnberg (loan) ====
On 7 August 2020, Singh joined 2. Bundesliga side 1. FC Nürnberg on a season-long loan. Singh had his first start for the club, playing 63 minutes for the team in their 0–3 loss to RB Leipzig in the DFB-Pokal. He made his first league start for the club against Jahn Regensburg on 19 September 2020. After playing a dozen games for Nürnberg of which he started six times, Singh cut his loan short and returned to Bayern Munich.

==== Jahn Regensburg (loan) ====
On 6 July 2021, Singh joined 2. Bundesliga side SSV Jahn Regensburg on a season-long loan.

After his transfer to Werder Bremen fell through, on 27 July 2022 Singh extended his contract with Bayern for an additional year and joined Regensburg on another season-long loan. However, as the club did not report the transfer to the DFL before the transfer window closed, Singh was unable to play for Regensburg until the winter transfer window opened on 1 January 2023.

=== Hansa Rostock ===
Singh left Bayern Munich after four years and joined 2. Bundesliga club Hansa Rostock on 5 July 2023, permanently for an undisclosed fee, signing a three-year contract.

On 6 June 2024, Hansa Rostock confirmed that Singh would be departing the club after his contract was nullified following the club's relegation to the 3. Liga.

=== União de Leiria ===
On 27 August 2024, Singh signed a contract with União de Leiria in Portugal for one season, with an option for two more.

=== TSC ===
In July 2025, Singh signed for Serbian SuperLiga side TSC.

==== Loan to Wellington Phoenix ====
In February 2026, Singh returned to Wellington Phoenix on loan until the end of the 2025–26 season. Singh made his return on 13 February in a 2–2 draw with Western Sydney Wanderers but was substituted due to injury. It was later confirmed that he had suffered a medial collateral ligament (MCL) injury, sidelining him for up to eight weeks. He made his return from injury on 24 April in the final game of Phoenix’s season, a 4–0 loss to Macarthur. During his loan spell he made 2 appearances without registering a goal or assist.

== International career ==
Singh's first international appearances for New Zealand came at under-17 level, being named to the 20-man squad for the 2015 OFC U-17 Championship.

Singh competed for New Zealand at the 2017 FIFA U-20 World Cup, being knocked out by the United States in the round of 16. Singh also appeared for New Zealand in the 2019 FIFA U-20 World Cup, being knocked out by Colombia in the round of 16 via penalty shootout following a 1–1 draw after extra time.

Singh earned his first senior national team call-up for a friendly match against Canada on 24 March 2018 in Murcia. He was substituted on in the second half of a 1–0 loss. Sarpreet scored his first goal for New Zealand on 2 June 2018, against Kenya in the 2018 Intercontinental Cup. In the same tournament, he provided both assists as his team defeated India 2–1.

Singh was named in New Zealand's Squad for the 2026 FIFA World Cup, becoming the first player of Indian heritage to appear at a FIFA World Cup since Vikash Dhorasoo represented France in 2006.

== Personal life ==
Singh was born in Auckland and is of Indian descent. While at Bayern, Singh was taking German lessons twice a week.

== Career statistics ==
=== Club ===
As of match played on 30 April 2026

Appearances and goals by club, season and competition
Club	Season	League			Cup		Other		Total	
Club	Season	Division	Apps	Goals	Apps	Goals	Apps	Goals	Apps	Goals
Wellington Phoenix Reserves	2015–16	NZ Premiership	12	1	—		—		12	1
Wellington Phoenix Reserves	2016–17	NZ Premiership	14	3	—		—		14	3
Wellington Phoenix Reserves	2017–18	NZ Premiership	7	4	—		—		7	4
Wellington Phoenix Reserves	2018–19	NZ Premiership	1	0	—		—		1	0
Wellington Phoenix Reserves	Total		34	8	—		—		34	8
Wellington Phoenix	2015–16	A-League	0	0	0	0	—		0	0
Wellington Phoenix	2016–17	A-League	2	0	0	0	—		2	0
Wellington Phoenix	2017–18	A-League	11	4	1	0	—		12	4
Wellington Phoenix	2018–19	A-League	25	5	1	0	1 (Note: Appearances in A-League Finals)	0	27	5
Wellington Phoenix	Total		39	9	2	0	—		41	9
Bayern Munich II	2019–20	3. Liga	22	7	—		—		22	7
Bayern Munich II	2020–21	3. Liga	16	3	—		—		16	3
Bayern Munich II	Total		38	10	—		—		38	10
Bayern Munich	2019–20	Bundesliga	2	0	6	0	0	0	8	0
Bayern Munich	2020–21	Bundesliga	0	0	0	0	0	0	0	0
Bayern Munich	Total		2	0	6	0	0	0	8	0
1. FC Nürnberg (loan)	2020–21	2. Bundesliga	11	0	1	0	—		12	0
Jahn Regensburg (loan)	2021–22	2. Bundesliga	25	5	2	1	—		27	6
Jahn Regensburg (loan)	2022–23	2. Bundesliga	14	1	0	0	—		14	1
Jahn Regensburg (loan)	Total		39	6	2	1	—		41	7
Hansa Rostock	2023–24	2. Bundesliga	15	1	1	0	—		16	1
União de Leiria	2024–25	Liga Portugal 2	19	4	1	0	—		20	4
TSC	2025–26	Serbian SuperLiga	15	2	1	0	—		16	2
Wellington Phoenix (loan)	2025–26	A-League Men	2	0	—		—		2	0
Farense	2026–27	Liga Portugal 2	0	0	0	0	—		0	0
Career total			166	33	11	1	1	0	178	34

=== International ===
Scores and results list New Zealand's goal tally first, score column indicates score after each Singh goal.

List of international goals scored by Sarpreet Singh
No.	Date	Venue	Opponent	Score	Result	Competition
1	2 June 2018	Mumbai Football Arena, Mumbai, India	Kenya	1–0	1–2	2018 Intercontinental Cup
2	15 November 2024	Waikato Stadium, Hamilton, New Zealand	Vanuatu	7–1	8–1	2026 FIFA World Cup qualification
3	21 March 2025	Sky Stadium, Wellington, New Zealand	Fiji	2–0	7–0	2026 FIFA World Cup qualification

== Honours ==
Bayern Munich

- Bundesliga: 2019–20
- DFB-Pokal: 2019–20
- UEFA Champions League 2019-20

Bayern Munich II

- 3. Liga: 2019–20

New Zealand U17

- OFC U-17 Championship: 2015

New Zealand U20

- OFC U-20 Championship: 2016
