= Liam Wood =

New Zealand footballer (born 1998)

Personal information
- Full name: Liam James Wood
- Date of birth: 30 March 1998 (age 28)
- Place of birth: Lower Hutt, New Zealand
- Height: 1.79 m (5 ft 10 in)
- Position: Central defender

Team information
- Current team: Team Wellington
- Number: 5

Youth career
- Wairarapa United
- Upper Hutt City

Senior career*
Years	Team	Apps	(Gls)
2015–2018	Wellington Phoenix Reserves	39	(1)
2017	Wellington Phoenix	0	(0)
2018–	Team Wellington	12	(0)
- * Club domestic league appearances and goals as of 11 February 2019 ‡ National team caps and goals as of 24 January 2018

Liam James Wood (born 30 March 1998) is a New Zealand semi-professional footballer who plays as central defender for Team Wellington.

Wood was touted as one of the hottest prospects to come out of Upper Hutt City FC, debuting for the Men’s Central League team at just 15 years old. His standout performances earned him a scholarship deal for the Wellington Phoenix, where he made his professional debut on 1 August 2017 in their round of 32 FFA Cup match against A-League side Western Sydney Wanderers FC.

Despite a promising early career with the Phoenix and Upper Hutt, Wood suffered ACL tears in both knees on separate occasions, which ultimately curtailed his once-promising career.
