= Tom Doyle =

New Zealand footballer

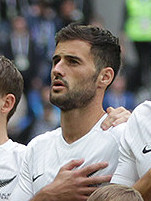
- Doyle representing New Zealand at the 2017 FIFA Confederations Cup

Personal information
- Full name: Thomas Joseph Doyle
- Date of birth: 30 June 1992 (age 34)
- Place of birth: Auckland, New Zealand
- Height: 1.84 m (6 ft 0 in)
- Position: Left back

Youth career
- –2010: Auckland City

Senior career*
Years	Team	Apps	(Gls)
2010–2012	Auckland City	0	(0)
2012	Miramar Rangers		
2012–2014	Team Wellington	26	(2)
2014–2015	Wellington Phoenix Reserves	31	(3)
2014–2019	Wellington Phoenix	83	(2)
2019	Chemnitzer FC	6	(0)
2020	Auckland City	7	(1)
2021–2022	Bay Olympic	14	(2)

International career^{‡}
2014–2017	New Zealand	5	(0)
- * Club domestic league appearances and goals as of 12 November 2025 ‡ National team caps and goals as of 15 June 2017

Thomas Joseph Doyle (born 30 June 1992) is a New Zealand former professional footballer who played as a left back.

== Association football career ==
Doyle made his senior professional debut for Wellington Phoenix FC in the 2014 FFA Cup against Adelaide United at the Marden Sports Complex on 5 August 2014. Adelaide won the match 1–0 in regulation time. During his time with Wellington, he also operated as centre back.

Following a short stint at German club Chemnitzer FC, where he made six appearances in four months, Auckland City confirmed that Doyle had returned to the club alongside club legend Emiliano Tade on 13 January 2020.

Doyle played for New Zealand at the 2017 Confederations Cup.

== Honours ==
Wellington Phoenix

- NE Super Series Championship runner-up: 2012

New Zealand

- OFC Nations Cup: 2016

== Other ventures ==
In 2026 it was announced that Doyle would take over presenting the TV show Moving Houses from Andy Ellis.

== See also ==
- List of Wellington Phoenix FC players
