= Matija Ljujić =

Serbian footballer

Matija Ljujić Матија Љујић
Personal information
- Date of birth: 28 October 1993 (age 33)
- Place of birth: Prijepolje, FR Yugoslavia
- Height: 1.85 m (6 ft 1 in)
- Position: Attacking midfielder

Team information
- Current team: Újpest
- Number: 88

Youth career
- Partizan

Senior career*
Years	Team	Apps	(Gls)
2010–2014	Teleoptik	102	(9)
2014	Partizan	0	(0)
2014	→ Mladost Lučani (loan)	1	(0)
2015–2016	Rad	21	(1)
2016–2017	Žalgiris	44	(7)
2018	Wellington Phoenix	14	(2)
2018–2019	Belenenses SAD	30	(0)
2019–2021	Bnei Yehuda	51	(5)
2021	Gangwon	10	(1)
2022	Hapoel Haifa	14	(0)
2022–	Újpest	86	(21)
2023	→ Sabail (loan)	14	(3)
- * Club domestic league appearances and goals as of 30 May 2026

Matija Ljujić (Serbian Cyrillic: Матија Љујић; born 28 October 1993) is a Serbian professional footballer who plays as an attacking midfielder for Hungarian side Újpest.

== Career ==
=== Early career ===
Ljujic is a product of the FK Partizan academy.

=== FK Rad ===
Ljujić played for Rad in the Serbian SuperLiga in 2015–16 season.

=== FK Žalgiris ===
On 15 June 2016 he signed for Lithuanian champions Žalgiris.

=== Wellington Phoenix ===
On 9 January 2018, Ljujić signed for Wellington Phoenix until the end of their 2017–18 season. He scored his first goal for the club in his debut home game against Western Sydney Wanderers, a long-range dipping strike that beat Vedran Janjetović in goal.

=== Belenenses ===
On 1 June 2018, Ljujić joined Belenenses on a three-year contract.

=== Bnei Yehuda ===
On 18 September 2019 Ljujić signed the Israeli Premier League club from the city Tel Aviv Bnei Yehuda.

=== Gangwon FC ===
On 20 July 2021 Ljujić joined the K League 1 club Gangwon FC.

=== Hapoel Haifa ===
On 26 January 2022, he joined the Israeli Premier League club Hapoel Haifa.

== Personal life ==
His father, Sinisa "Maca" Ljujic, is a football coach.

== Honours ==
=== Individual ===
- Nemzeti Bajnokság I Player of the Month: August 2024
