= Dylan Fox =

Northern Irish footballer (born 1994)

Personal information
- Full name: Dylan James Fox
- Date of birth: 15 April 1994 (age 32)
- Place of birth: Belfast, Northern Ireland
- Position: Centre-back

Team information
- Current team: Tampines Rovers
- Number: 16

Youth career
- Sutherland Sharks

Senior career*
Years	Team	Apps	(Gls)
2013	Sutherland Sharks	2	(0)
2014–2015	Bonnyrigg White Eagles	43	(3)
2015–2019	Wellington Phoenix Reserves	15	(0)
2015–2019	Wellington Phoenix	38	(0)
2019	Anyang	0	(0)
2019–2020	Central Coast Mariners	11	(1)
2020–2021	NorthEast United	21	(0)
2021–2022	Goa	10	(1)
2023	Jamshedpur	3	(0)
2024	Lahti	15	(0)
2025–	Tampines Rovers	12	(0)
- * Club domestic league appearances and goals as of 4 June 2025

Dylan James Fox (born 15 April 1994) is a Northern Irish professional footballer who plays primarily as a centre-back for Singapore Premier League club Tampines Rovers.

== Club career ==
=== Sutherland Sharks ===
Fox started his youth career with Sydney-based Sutherland Sharks. He was promoted to the senior team in 2013 and played in the National Premier Leagues NSW.

=== Bonnyrigg White Eagles ===
In 2014, he moved to Bonnyrigg White Eagles and played until 2015 and scored 3 goals in 43 league matches.

=== Wellington Phoenix ===
In October 2015, Fox joined the A-League with Wellington Phoenix offering him a two-year contract. He was named the Player's Player at the Wellington Phoenix awards for the 2017–18 season and was a close second to Roy Krishna for Player of the Year. He was also named the best Wellington Phoenix Under-23 Player of the Year in 2016. In March 2019, Wellington Phoenix and Fox mutually terminated his contract while he was sidelined with a season-ending injury and having received an offer from Korean club FC Anyang.

=== Anyang ===
On 18 March 2019, Fox signed for K League 2 club Anyang. Without any appearances, he left the club in August.

=== Central Coast Mariners ===
In August 2019, Fox returned to the A-League, signing a one-year contract with Central Coast Mariners.

=== NorthEast United ===
On 2 October 2020, Fox joined Indian Super League club NorthEast United on a one-year deal. Appearing in 21 matches, he played a crucial role in their campaign, helping Khalid Jamil's side finish third on the league table before bowing out to ATK Mohun Bagan in the semi-finals.

=== Goa ===
On 31 August 2021, Fox joined another Indian Super League club Goa on a one-year deal. He scored his first ISL goal on 23 January 2022 against Bengaluru in Goa's 1–1 draw.

=== Jamshedpur ===
On 30 December 2022, Fox signed for Jamshedpur on a contract until the end of the 2022–23 season.

=== Lahti ===
On 28 February 2024, Fox moved to Finland after signing with Lahti in Veikkausliiga. He make his debut on 6 April in a league match against Ilves.

=== Tampines Rovers ===
On 5 January 2025, Fox moved to Singapore to sign with Tampines Rovers where he was later announced as a new player for the remainder of the 2024–25 season campaign.

== Career statistics ==
As of 4 June 2025

Appearances and goals by club, season and competition
Club	Season	League			National cup (Note: Includes Australia Cup, Suomen Cup, Singapore Cup)		Other		Total	
Club	Season	Division	Apps	Goals	Apps	Goals	Apps	Goals	Apps	Goals
Sutherland Sharks	2013	NPL NSW	2	0	–		–		2	0
Bonnyrigg White Eagles	2014	NPL NSW					–			
Bonnyrigg White Eagles	2015	NPL NSW					–			
Bonnyrigg White Eagles	Total		43	3	0	0	0	0	43	3
Wellington Phoenix	2015–16	A-League	12	0	–		–		12	0
Wellington Phoenix	2016–17	A-League	6	0	–		–		6	0
Wellington Phoenix	2017–18	A-League	15	0	–		–		15	0
Wellington Phoenix	2018–19	A-League	6	0	1	0	–		7	0
Wellington Phoenix	Total		39	0	1	0	0	0	40	0
Wellington Phoenix Reserves	2015–16	New Zealand Premiership	5	0	–		–		5	0
Wellington Phoenix Reserves	2016–17	New Zealand Premiership	8	0	–		–		8	0
Wellington Phoenix Reserves	2017–18	New Zealand Premiership	1	0	–		–		1	0
Wellington Phoenix Reserves	2018–19	New Zealand Premiership	1	0	–		–		1	0
Wellington Phoenix Reserves	Total		15	0	0	0	0	0	15	0
Anyang	2019	K League 2	0	0	0	0	–		0	0
Central Coast Mariners	2019–20	A-League	11	1	3	0	–		14	1
NorthEast United	2020–21	Indian Super League	21	0	–		–		21	0
Goa	2021–22	Indian Super League	10	1	–		–		10	1
Jamshedpur	2022–23	Indian Super League	0	0	–		–		0	0
Lahti	2024	Veikkausliiga	15	0	1	0	4 (Note: Includes Finnish League Cup)	0	20	0
Tampines Rovers	2024–25	Singapore Premier League	12	0	6	1	–		18	1
Career total			168	5	11	1	4	0	183	6

== Honours ==
=== Tampines Rovers ===
- Singapore Community Shield: 2025
