= Reuben Way =

Australian footballer

Personal information
- Full name: Reuben Way
- Date of birth: 8 February 1990 (age 36)
- Place of birth: Brisbane, Australia
- Position: Left back

Team information
- Current team: Heidelberg United
- Number: 7

Youth career
- Rochedale Rovers

Senior career*
Years	Team	Apps	(Gls)
2008–2010	Rochedale Rovers	21	(3)
2010	Gold Coast United	0	(0)
2010–2012	Rochedale Rovers	52	(26)
2013	Redlands United	21	(20)
2014	Olympic FC	22	(24)
2015–2018	Heidelberg United	97	(19)
2018–2019	Wellington Phoenix Reserves	5	(0)
2018–2019	Wellington Phoenix	1	(0)
2019–	Heidelberg United	37	(3)
- * Club domestic league appearances and goals as of 7 September 2021

Reuben Way is an Australian footballer who plays as a left back for Heidelberg United in NPL Victoria.

In 2018 Way join with the Wellington Phoenix in the A-League. Having made many appearances in the lower leagues of Australian football, Way finally made his senior professional debut at the age of 28 as a substitute for Wellington Phoenix in a match against Perth Glory at Westpac Stadium on 2 December 2018.
