= Roy Krishna =

Fijian footballer (born 1987)

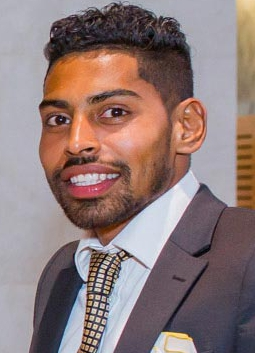
- Krishna in 2016

Personal information
- Full name: Roy Christopher Krishna
- Date of birth: 30 August 1987 (age 39)
- Place of birth: Labasa, Fiji
- Height: 1.69 m (5 ft 7 in)
- Position: Striker

Team information
- Current team: Bula FC
- Number: 21

Senior career*
Years	Team	Apps	(Gls)
2006–2007	Labasa	10	(7)
2008–2013	Waitakere United	75	(55)
2013	Auckland City	4	(1)
2014–2019	Wellington Phoenix	122	(51)
2019–2020	ATK	21	(15)
2020–2022	Mohun Bagan	39	(21)
2022–2023	Bengaluru	22	(6)
2023–2025	Odisha	34	(16)
2025	Malappuram	9	(2)
2026–	Bula FC	18	(4)

International career^{‡}
2007	Fiji U20	6	(8)
2008–2016	Fiji Olympic	5	(3)
2007–	Fiji	68	(47)
Medal record
Men's football
Representing Fiji
OFC Nations Cup
Third place	2008 Oceania
OFC U-20 Championship
Runner-up	2007 New Zealand
Pacific Games
Silver medal – second place	2007 Samoa
Bronze medal – third place	2019 Samoa
Bronze medal – third place	2023 Solomon Islands
MSG Prime Minister's Cup
Winner	2026 Fiji
Third place	2022 Vanuatu
- * Club domestic league appearances and goals as of 04:07, 17 January 2026 (UTC) ‡ National team caps and goals as of 3 October 2026

Roy Christopher Krishna (born 30 August 1987) is a Fijian professional footballer who plays as a striker and captains both Bula FC and the Fiji national team. He is the most-capped and highest-scoring Fijian footballer of all-time.

== Early life ==
Krishna was born on 30 August 1987 in the village of Siberia, Labasa to Bal and Sarita Krishna. His great-grandparents come from Kolkata, India and were part of the labour force controlled by the British, which eventually led them to Fiji in the late 19th century. He practised football since primary school at St Mary’s and earned his first football shoes at the age of 5, gifted by his father at the expense of the family’s weekly budget for rice. Krishna also played rugby with his friends before his parents asked him to change sports. Immersed in the Indian culture, he tried to master the dholak and played alongside his father, who played the harmonium and sang songs derived from the Ramayana. Due to the country's limited resources and lack of experienced footballers, he idolised Fijian striker Simon Peters, who played for Labasa FC.

== Club career ==
=== Early career ===
Krishna joined the New Zealand Football Championship (NZFC) side Waitakere United from Fijian local outfit Labasa FC in January 2008.

In May 2008, he spent two weeks training with the Wellington Phoenix, but was not offered a contract.

In March 2009, it was reported that PSV Eindhoven was interested in signing him. However he said professional football in New Zealand with the Phoenix was his preferred option because he was not ready to move to Europe as he was still learning English and was not ready for another language. Later, in June 2013, Krishna was offered a one-month trial by EFL Championship club Derby County; however, he was unable to attend due to restrictions imposed upon him due to his recent acquisition of New Zealand permanent residency.

In his 6 seasons with Waitakere United, Krishna managed 55 goals in 75 appearances and has won the NZFC Golden Boot in the 2012–13 season.

=== Auckland City ===
In September 2013, it was announced that he had joined Waitakere's local rivals Auckland City for the upcoming ASB Premiership season. On 12 December 2013, he scored Auckland City's goal in a 2–1 defeat to Raja Casablanca in the 2013 FIFA Club World Cup, becoming the first Fijian to score at the finals of a FIFA tournament.

=== Wellington Phoenix ===
On 7 January 2014, Krishna signed with the A-League's Wellington Phoenix until the end of the 2013–14 season as an injury replacement for Paul Ifill, scoring his debut goal on 16 March 2014 against the Melbourne Heart, beating Andrew Redmayne with a powerful drive into the bottom right corner. The match ended in a 2–2 draw. His performance in the match earned him the A-League's player of the week honors. Four days later, Krishna came to terms on a new 2-year contract with the Phoenix.

On 29 February 2016, Krishna extended his contract with the club, agreeing to a 2-year deal that would keep him at Wellington until the end of the 2017–18 season. He subsequently signed a 1-year extension on 15 February 2018.

On 18 April 2018, Krishna was named Wellington Phoenix Player of the Year and his fourth-round goal against Brisbane Roar was deemed the team's Goal of the Year for the 2017–18 season.

On 2 December 2018, Krishna became the outright leading goal scorer for the Wellington Phoenix, overtaking previous leader Paul Ifill's 33 goals for the club. Krishna made A-League history on 19 January 2019, becoming the first player to score 3 consecutive braces.

On 13 May 2019, Krishna was awarded the Johnny Warren Medal for his performances in the 2018–19 A-League season. On 27 May 2019, Krishna announced his departure from Wellington Phoenix after a long-term deal was not reached.

=== Mohun Bagan ===
On 18 June 2019, Krishna announced he had signed a one-year deal with ATK (Now Mohun Bagan Super Giants), which played in the Indian Super League. Krishna got off the mark with a goal against Hyderabad in what was only his second match for ATK, and thereafter, it became a familiar sight. Despite a minor injury problem, he finished with 15 goals, the highest in the league alongside Nerijus Valskis and Bartholomew Ogbeche, and six assists from 21 games. Krishna was influential in ATK reaching the final in his first season with the club, scoring a goal in the second leg of their semi-final victory against Bengaluru on 8 March 2020. He also played a pivotal role in ATK winning their record-breaking third league title with an assist in their 3–1 win over Chennaiyin in the final.

Following the 2019–20 season, the team ATK was dissolved and its brand got merged with the more than a century old club, Mohun Bagan to form ATK Mohun Bagan. In ATK Mohun Bagan's first Indian Super League match on 20 November 2020, Krishna scored the club's first goal in ISL and was awarded the man of the match in their 1–0 victory over Kerala Blasters. He scored in the club's next match on 27 November, the inaugural Indian Super League Kolkata Derby against East Bengal; Mohun Bagan won the match 2–0. Krishna went on to help his team finish second in the league stage and grab up the runners up spot in the playoffs, also winning the golden ball award for contributing 22 goals in 23 games. On Mohun Bagan Day 2021, he extended his contract for another year at the club and was also awarded 'Best Footballer of the Year' by Mohun Bagan. In the 2021 AFC Cup, Krishna scored 2 goals for the team in the group stage.

In his second season with the club, he was diagnosed with COVID-19 and played only a few matches due to recurring injuries. He scored only 7 goals in what had been an underwhelming league season for him so far. In the 2022 AFC Cup, he scored his only goal in the tournament during his last match with the club against Maziya. On 3 June 2022, his contract expired ahead of the upcoming season and parted ways with the club.

=== Bengaluru ===
In July 2022, Krishna penned a two-year deal, the second of which is an optional extension with Bengaluru. On 17 August, he scored on his debut against Jamshedpur in the Durand Cup, which ended in a 2–1 win.

=== Odisha ===
On 17 July 2023, Odisha announced the signing of Krishna on a one-year deal. On 4 December 2024, Odisha announced that Krishna will be sidelined for the remainder of the 2024–25 season due to an ACL injury sustained during the game against Hyderabad.

=== Malappuram ===
On 8 September 2025, Krishna signed for Super League Kerala club Malappuram.

=== Bula FC ===
On 26 December 2025, Krishna returned to Fiji, being announced as the first marquee signing for newly founded OFC Professional League club Bula FC. On 17 January 2026, Krishna made his debut in the inaugural OFC Professional League match, a 2–2 draw against Vanuatu United. He also scored the club's first-ever goal, equalising the match at 1–1. He captained the team finishing in the top four in the debut season.

== International career ==
Krishna made his debut for Fiji at the South Pacific Games 2007 and he has played for them in the 2010 FIFA World Cup qualification tournament.

In 2010, Krishna was also called up to the national futsal team for the 2010 OFC Futsal Championship.

On 16 July 2016, Krishna was named as one of the three over-aged players of the Fiji U23 team in the 2016 Summer Olympics, alongside Simione Tamanisau and Alvin Singh. On 7 August 2016, he scored the team's only goal in the final tournament's campaign, against Mexico. Krishna's goal was Fiji's first ever goal in the Olympic Games.

In 2021, Krishna was named Oceania Football Confederation ambassador.

On 18 November 2023, Krishna became the all-time leading goal-scorer for the OFC, after surpassing the record of 34 goals by both Commins Menapi of Solomon Islands, who held the record for more than fifteen years, and Chris Wood of New Zealand.

In the 2024 OFC Nations Cup, Krishna became the tournament top scorer with 5 goals.

== Personal life ==
Krishna is an Indo-Fijian. After living in New Zealand for ten years, he gained his citizenship in December 2018. Krishna is trilingual: he can speak fluent English, Fijian and Hindi.

In July 2018, Krishna married Indo-Fijian model and media business owner Naziah Ali. They welcomed their first child in 2022.

== Career statistics ==
=== Club ===
Appearances and goals by club, season and competition
Club	Season	League			National cup (Note: Includes Australia Cup, Indian Super Cup)		Continental		Other		Total	
Club	Season	Division	Apps	Goals	Apps	Goals	Apps	Goals	Apps	Goals	Apps	Goals
Waitakere United	2007–08	NZ Premiership	4	0	0	0	0	0	—		4	0
Waitakere United	2008–09	NZ Premiership	14	11	0	0	3 (Note: Appearances in OFC Champions League)	3	1 (Note: Appearance in FIFA Club World Cup)	0	18	14
Waitakere United	2009–10	NZ Premiership	16	8	0	0	6	1	—		22	9
Waitakere United	2010–11	NZ Premiership	11	6	0	0	4	2	—		15	8
Waitakere United	2011–12	NZ Premiership	16	11	0	0	6	5	—		22	16
Waitakere United	2012–13	NZ Premiership	14	19	0	0	8	6	—		22	25
Waitakere United	Total		75	55	0	0	27	17	1	0	103	72
Auckland City	2013–14	NZ Premiership	4	1	0	0	—		1	1	5	2
Wellington Phoenix	2013–14	A-League	9	1	0	0	—		—		9	1
Wellington Phoenix	2014–15	A-League	24	9	0	0	—		—		24	9
Wellington Phoenix	2015–16	A-League	16	6	1	1	—		—		17	7
Wellington Phoenix	2016–17	A-League	25	12	0	0	—		—		25	12
Wellington Phoenix	2017–18	A-League	21	4	1	0	—		—		22	4
Wellington Phoenix	2018–19	A-League	27	19	1	0	—		—		28	19
Wellington Phoenix	Total		122	51	3	1	—		—		125	52
ATK	2019–20	Indian Super League	21	15	—		—		—		21	15
Mohun Bagan	2020–21	Indian Super League	23	14	—		4 (Note: Appearances in AFC Cup)	2	—		27	16
Mohun Bagan	2021–22	Indian Super League	16	7	—		3	1	—		19	8
Mohun Bagan	Total		39	21	—		7	3	—		46	24
Bengaluru	2022–23	Indian Super League	22	6	5	1	—		6 (Note: Appearances in Durand Cup)	3	33	10
Odisha	2023–24	Indian Super League	25	13	5	0	8	2	0	0	38	15
Odisha	2024–25	Indian Super League	9	3	0	0	0	0	0	0	9	3
Odisha	Total		34	16	5	0	8	2	0	0	47	18
Malappuram	2025	Super League Kerala	9	2	—		—		—		9	2
Bula	2026	OFC Pro League	18	4	—		—		—		18	4
Career total			326	167	13	2	56	25	8	4	403	198

=== International ===
As of match played 3 October 2026

Appearances and goals by national team and year
National team	Year	Apps	Goals
Fiji	2007	8	4
Fiji	2008	3	2
Fiji	2009	0	0
Fiji	2010	0	0
Fiji	2011	8	8
Fiji	2012	3	0
Fiji	2013	0	0
Fiji	2014	0	0
Fiji	2015	1	1
Fiji	2016	4	4
Fiji	2017	5	1
Fiji	2018	3	2
Fiji	2019	6	7
Fiji	2020	0	0
Fiji	2021	0	0
Fiji	2022	7	3
Fiji	2023	2	3
Fiji	2024	11	9
Fiji	2025	0	0
Fiji	2026	7	3
Total		68	47

Scores and results list Fiji's goal tally first.

List of international goals scored by Roy Krishna
No.	Date	Venue	Opponent	Score	Result	Competition
1.	25 August 2007	National Soccer Stadium, Apia, Samoa	Tuvalu	1–0	16–0	2007 South Pacific Games
2.	25 August 2007	National Soccer Stadium, Apia, Samoa	Tuvalu	3–0	16–0	2007 South Pacific Games
3.	25 August 2007	National Soccer Stadium, Apia, Samoa	Tuvalu	5–0	16–0	2007 South Pacific Games
4.	5 September 2007	National Soccer Stadium, Apia, Samoa	Vanuatu	3–0	3–0	2007 South Pacific Games
5.	19 November 2008	Churchill Park, Lautoka, Fiji	New Zealand	1–0	2–0	2008 OFC Nations Cup
6.	19 November 2008	Churchill Park, Lautoka, Fiji	New Zealand	2–0	2–0	2008 OFC Nations Cup
7.	17 August 2011	Thomson Park, Tavua, Fiji	Samoa	1–0	3–0	Friendly
8.	18 August 2011	National Stadium, Suva, Fiji	Samoa	1–0	5–1	Friendly
9.	18 August 2011	National Stadium, Suva, Fiji	Samoa	2–0	5–1	Friendly
10.	18 August 2011	National Stadium, Suva, Fiji	Samoa	3–0	5–1	Friendly
11.	30 August 2011	Stade Boewa, Boulari Bay, New Caledonia	Kiribati	1–0	9–0	2011 Pacific Games
12.	30 August 2011	Stade Boewa, Boulari Bay, New Caledonia	Kiribati	4–0	9–0	2011 Pacific Games
13.	30 August 2011	Stade Boewa, Boulari Bay, New Caledonia	Kiribati	7–0	9–0	2011 Pacific Games
14.	3 September 2011	Stade Boewa, Boulari Bay, New Caledonia	Cook Islands	1–0	4–1	2011 Pacific Games
15.	10 November 2015	Port Vila Municipal Stadium, Port Vila, Vanuatu	Vanuatu	1–2	1–2	Friendly
16.	28 May 2016	Sir John Guise Stadium, Port Moresby, Papua New Guinea	New Zealand	1–2	1–3	2016 OFC Nations Cup
17.	31 May 2016	Sir John Guise Stadium, Port Moresby, Papua New Guinea	Solomon Islands	1–0	1–0	2016 OFC Nations Cup
18.	4 June 2016	Sir John Guise Stadium, Port Moresby, Papua New Guinea	Vanuatu	2–2	2–3	2016 OFC Nations Cup
19.	26 June 2016	Prince Charles Park, Nadi, Fiji	Malaysia	1–1	1–1	Friendly
20.	7 June 2017	Churchill Park, Lautoka, Fiji	New Caledonia	2–2	2–2	2018 FIFA World Cup qualification
21.	22 March 2018	Rizal Memorial Stadium, Manila, Philippines	Philippines	2–3	2–3	Friendly
22.	5 September 2018	National Stadium, Suva, Fiji	Solomon Islands	1–1	1–1	Friendly
23.	24 March 2019	Churchill Park, Lautoka, Fiji	Mauritius	1–0	1–0	Friendly
24.	8 July 2019	National Soccer Stadium, Apia, Samoa	Tahiti	2–0	2–1	2019 Pacific Games
25.	15 July 2019	National Soccer Stadium, Apia, Samoa	Tuvalu	9–1	10–1	2019 Pacific Games
26.	15 July 2019	National Soccer Stadium, Apia, Samoa	Tuvalu	10–1	10–1	2019 Pacific Games
27.	18 July 2019	National Soccer Stadium, Apia, Samoa	Solomon Islands	3–0	4–4	2019 Pacific Games
28.	18 July 2019	National Soccer Stadium, Apia, Samoa	Solomon Islands	4–2	4–4	2019 Pacific Games
29.	20 July 2019	National Soccer Stadium, Apia, Samoa	Papua New Guinea	1–1	1–1	2019 Pacific Games
30.	28 March 2022	Hamad bin Khalifa Stadium, Doha, Qatar	Vanuatu	1–1	2–1	Friendly
31.	28 March 2022	Hamad bin Khalifa Stadium, Doha, Qatar	Vanuatu	2–1	2–1	Friendly
32.	24 September 2022	Luganville Soccer Stadium, Luganville, Vanuatu	Solomon Islands	1–2	2–2	2022 MSG Prime Minister's Cup
33.	18 November 2023	SIFF Academy Field, Honiara, Solomon Islands	Northern Mariana Islands	2–0	10–0	2023 Pacific Games
34.	18 November 2023	SIFF Academy Field, Honiara, Solomon Islands	Northern Mariana Islands	3–0	10–0	2023 Pacific Games
35.	18 November 2023	SIFF Academy Field, Honiara, Solomon Islands	Northern Mariana Islands	5–0	10–0	2023 Pacific Games
36.	21 March 2024	Lawson Tama Stadium, Honiara, Solomon Islands	Solomon Islands	2–0	2–0	Friendly
37.	16 June 2024	HFC Bank Stadium, Suva, Fiji	Papua New Guinea	5–0	5–1	2024 OFC Nations Cup
38.	19 June 2024	HFC Bank Stadium, Suva, Fiji	Samoa	3–0	9–1	2024 OFC Nations Cup
39.	19 June 2024	HFC Bank Stadium, Suva, Fiji	Samoa	4–1	9–1	2024 OFC Nations Cup
40.	22 June 2024	HFC Bank Stadium, Suva, Fiji	Tahiti	1–0	1–0	2024 OFC Nations Cup
41.	30 June 2024	VFF Freshwater Stadium, Port Vila, Vanuatu	Tahiti	1–0	1–2	2024 OFC Nations Cup
42.	10 October 2024	HFC Bank Stadium, Suva, Fiji	Solomon Islands	1–0	1–0	2026 FIFA World Cup qualification
43.	14 November 2024	PNG Football Stadium, Port Moresby, Papua New Guinea	Papua New Guinea	2–2	3–3	2026 FIFA World Cup qualification
44.	17 November 2024	PNG Football Stadium, Port Moresby, Papua New Guinea	New Caledonia	1–0	1–1	2026 FIFA World Cup qualification
45.	9 June 2026	Freshwater Stadium, Port Vila, Vanuatu	Vanuatu	2–1	2–2	Friendly
46.	18 September 2026	HFC Bank Stadium, Suva, Fiji	Solomon Islands	1–0	3–3	2026 MSG Prime Minister's Cup
47.	27 September 2026	HFC Bank Stadium, Suva, Fiji	Papua New Guinea	1–0	2–0	2026 MSG Prime Minister's Cup

== Honours ==
=== Player ===
Waitakere United

- New Zealand Football Championship: 2007–08, 2009–10, 2010–11, 2011–12, 2012–13
- OFC Champions League: 2007–08

Auckland City

- Charity Cup: 2013

ATK

- Indian Super League: 2019–20

Mohun Bagan

- Indian Super League runner-up: 2020–21

Bengaluru

- Durand Cup: 2022
- Indian Super League runner-up: 2022–23
- Super Cup runner-up: 2023

Fiji

- OFC Nations Cup: 3rd place, 2008
- Pacific Games: Silver Medalist, 2007; Bronze Medalist, 2019, 2023
- MSG Prime Minister's Cup: 2026; 3rd place, 2022

Fiji U20

- OFC U-20 Championship: Runner-Up, 2007

=== Individual ===
- OFC U-20 Championship Golden Boot: 2007 (8 goals)
- Oceania Footballer of the Year nominee: 2008
- New Zealand Football Championship Player of the Year: 2008–09
- New Zealand Football Championship Golden Boot: 2012–13 (12 goals)
- Wellington Phoenix Players' Player of the Year: 2016–17
- Wellington Phoenix Goal of the season: 2017–18 (vs. Brisbane Roar on 28 October 2017)
- Wellington Phoenix Player of the Year: 2017–18
- A-League Player of the Month: January 2019
- A-League Golden Boot: 2018–19 (18 goals)
- Johnny Warren Medal: 2018–19
- Indian Super League Player of the Month: November 2019, December 2023
- Indian Super League top scorer: 2019–20, 2020–21
- IFFHS OFC Men's Team of the Decade 2011–2020
- IFFHS Oceania Men's Team of All Time: 2021
- Indian Super League Hero of the League: 2020–21
- Mohun Bagan Best footballer of the year: 2021
- OFC Men's Nations Cup Golden Boot: 2024 (5 goals)

== See also ==
- List of top international men's football goalscorers by country
- List of Indian football first tier top scorers
