= Ryan Lowry =

Australian soccer player

Personal information
- Date of birth: 11 October 1993 (age 33)
- Place of birth: Perth, Australia
- Height: 1.81 m (5 ft 11 in)
- Position: Central defender

Team information
- Current team: Olympic Kingsway

Youth career
- 2011–2013: Perth Glory

Senior career*
Years	Team	Apps	(Gls)
2012	Inglewood United	8	(0)
2013–2016	ECU Joondalup		
2016–2019	Wellington Phoenix Reserves	15	(1)
2016–2019	Wellington Phoenix	19	(0)
2020–2023	Perth RedStar	35	(4)
2023–	Olympic Kingsway	0	(0)
- * Club domestic league appearances and goals as of 22 November 2023

Ryan Lowry is an Australian professional football (soccer) player who plays as a central defender for Olympic Kingsway in the NPL WA.

== Early life ==
Ryan's older brother Shane is also a professional footballer playing in the Malaysia Super League club, Johor Darul Ta'zim.

== Playing career ==
Lowry signed a one-year contract to play with Wellington Phoenix in the A-League in September 2016, moving from ECU Joondalup.
