= Keegan Smith (New Zealand footballer) =

New Zealand footballer

Personal information
- Full name: Keegan Smith
- Date of birth: 13 May 1999 (age 27)
- Place of birth: Auckland, New Zealand
- Position: Goalkeeper

Team information
- Current team: Birkenhead United
- Number: 13

Youth career
- 2013–2016: Ellerslie
- 2016–2017: Wellington Phoenix

Senior career*
Years	Team	Apps	(Gls)
2016–2018	Phoenix Reserves	5	(0)
2017–2018	Wellington Phoenix	6	(0)
2018	Lower Hutt City	12	(0)
2018–2019	Tasman United	11	(0)
2019	Wellington Olympic	16	(0)
2020	Miramar Rangers	15	(0)
2020–2021	Team Wellington	2	(0)
2022–2023	Devonport City	41	(0)
2024	Sturt Lions	0	(0)
2025–	Birkenhead United	31	(0)
- * Club domestic league appearances and goals as of 18 April 2026

Keegan Smith (born 13 May 1999) is a New Zealand footballer who plays as a goalkeeper for National League club Birkenhead United.

== Club career ==
=== A-League ===
In 2016, Smith signed for the Wellington Phoenix, playing for the reserve side in the ISPS Handa Premiership. In 2017, Smith was promoted indefinitely to the first-team and named as the club's new No.1 goalkeeper, ahead of Oliver Sail and Lewis Italiano. He made his A-League league debut on 8 October 2017 in a 1–1 draw with Adelaide United. On 9 November 2017, Smith was rewarded for his performances with a three-year professional deal.

=== New Zealand career ===
In May 2018, Smith moved to Phoenix feeder club, Lower Hutt to get game time before returning for year two of his contract. During this time, Smith continued to train with the A-League side.

In October 2018, it was announced that Smith and the Phoenix had agreed to a mutual termination to allow him to play regularly, transferring to Tasman United in the ISPS Handa Premiership.

Between 2019 and 2021, Smith would play for several Wellington sides in the ISPS Handa Premiership and Central League. These clubs included Wellington Olympic, Team Wellington and Miramar Rangers.

=== Australian career ===
In 2022, Smith moved to Australia to sign for National Premier Leagues Tasmania powerhouses and Australia Cup regulars, Devonport City. Smith was an integral part of the club as he helped them claim the league and state title in both 2022 and 2023, and feature in the Australia Cup against his former club, Wellington Phoenix, and the Gold Coast Knights. He would win several honours, including NPL Tasmania Goalkeeper of the Year.
