= Adam Parkhouse =

Australian soccer player

Personal information
- Full name: Adam Parkhouse
- Date of birth: 15 December 1992 (age 33)
- Place of birth: Davistown, Australia
- Positions: Left winger; left back

Youth career
- Wigan Athletic

Senior career*
Years	Team	Apps	(Gls)
2012	Leigh Genesis		
2012	Skelmersdale United		
2012	Atherton Laburnum Rovers		
2013–2014	Stalybridge Celtic	10	(0)
2013	→ Witton Albion (loan)		
2014	Mossley		
2015–2016	Manly United	46	(8)
2016–2018	Wellington Phoenix	36	(0)
2016–2018	Wellington Phoenix Reserves	5	(0)
2019–2020	Manly United	22	(3)
2020–2025	Sydney Olympic	127	(15)
- * Club domestic league appearances and goals as of 31 August 2025

Adam Parkhouse (born 15 December 1992) is an Australian footballer who lasted plays as a midfielder for Sydney Olympic.

== Playing career ==
Parkhouse moved to Witton Albion on loan from Stalybridge Celtic in September 2013.

He signed for Mossley in September 2014, playing four times for the club.

In August 2016, Parkhouse signed for A-League club Wellington Phoenix from Manly United on a one-year deal.

On 14 December 2016, just in time for his 24th birthday, Parkhouse signed a two-year extension with Wellington Phoenix.

On 20 July 2018, Parkhouse left the Wellington Phoenix after agreeing to a mutual termination of his contract.
