= Andrija Kaluđerović =

Serbian footballer

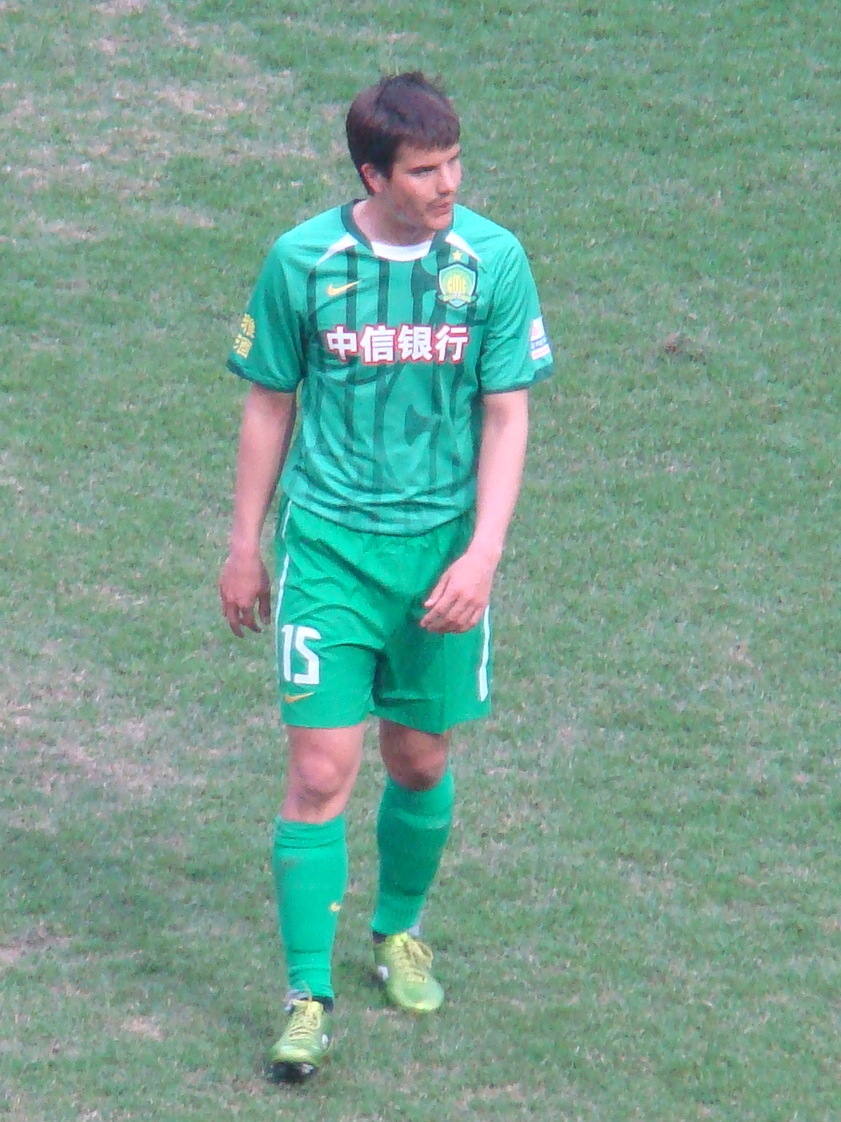
- Kaluđerović with Beijing Guoan in 2012

Personal information
- Date of birth: 5 July 1987 (age 39)
- Place of birth: Bačka Topola, SR Serbia, SFR Yugoslavia
- Height: 1.81 m (5 ft 11 in)
- Position: Striker

Team information
- Current team: Rad

Youth career
- AIK Bačka Topola
- OFK Beograd

Senior career*
Years	Team	Apps	(Gls)
2003–2008	OFK Beograd	52	(12)
2004	→ Njegoš Lovćenac (loan)	1	(0)
2005	→ Mačva Šabac (loan)	1	(0)
2005	→ Hajduk Beograd (loan)	13	(5)
2006	→ Spartak Subotica (loan)	30	(11)
2007	→ Radnički Pirot (loan)	1	(0)
2009–2010	Rad	45	(21)
2010–2012	Red Star Belgrade	43	(19)
2012–2014	Beijing Guoan	11	(2)
2012–2013	→ Racing Santander (loan)	18	(3)
2013	→ Vojvodina (loan)	15	(5)
2014	→ AEL Limassol (loan)	18	(5)
2014	Thun	12	(2)
2015	Brisbane Roar	10	(5)
2015	Al Shahaniya	8	(6)
2016	Rad	15	(6)
2016	Žalgiris	19	(20)
2017	Port	9	(3)
2017–2018	Wellington Phoenix	23	(9)
2018	Olimpija Ljubljana	0	(0)
2018	Delhi Dynamos	12	(1)
2019	Inter Zaprešić	8	(0)
2019	RFS	10	(2)
2020	Rad	9	(7)
2020	Žalgiris	9	(4)
2021	Rad	19	(9)
2021	Proleter Novi Sad	2	(1)
2021	Nasaf	14	(2)
2022	Proleter Novi Sad	14	(0)
2022	Grafičar Beograd	18	(5)
2023	OFK Beograd	15	(10)
2025–	Rad	23	(14)

International career
2005	Serbia and Montenegro U19 (Note: Official UEFA matches only)	1	(0)
2007	Serbia U21	7	(2)
2008	Serbia U23	2	(0)
2010–2011	Serbia	3	(0)
- * Club domestic league appearances and goals as of 15 July 2026

Andrija Kaluđerović (Serbian Cyrillic: Андрија Калуђеровић; born 5 July 1987) is a Serbian professional footballer who plays as a striker for Rad.

== Club career ==
The much-travelled Kaluđerović made his senior debut for OFK Beograd under manager Stevica Kuzmanovski, coming on as an injury-time substitute for Hristijan Kirovski in a 1–1 away league draw against Budućnost Banatski Dvor on 13 December 2003, aged 16. He spent the majority of the following three seasons on loan to various clubs, most notably Spartak Subotica in the Serbian First League. In the 2009 winter transfer window, Kaluđerović moved from OFK Beograd to fellow Serbian SuperLiga club Rad.

=== Red Star Belgrade ===
In August 2010, Kaluđerović signed a three-year contract with Red Star Belgrade. He was the league's joint top scorer in the 2010–11 season, alongside Ivica Iliev, with 13 goals. In February 2012, Kaluđerović was transferred to Chinese Super League club Beijing Guoan for an undisclosed fee.

In July 2013, Kaluđerović returned to Serbia and joined Vojvodina on a season-long loan. His loan was later transferred to Cypriot club AEL Limassol in January 2014.

=== Brisbane Roar ===
On 29 January 2015, Brisbane Roar announced that they had acquired the services of the Serbian for the remainder of the 2014–15 A-League, with an option to an extension at the end of the season. Upon his arrival to the club, Kaluđerović said that it had been a desire of his to play in Australia for the Roar since facing them in the 2012 AFC Champions League, then with Beijing Guoan. He scored his first goal on his debut for the side in a 2–0 win over Central Coast Mariners. On 30 May 2015, Kaluđerović was released by new manager John Aloisi as his contract expired.

=== Wellington Phoenix ===
On 15 August 2017, it was announced that Kaluđerović would be returning to the A-League to play for the Wellington Phoenix on a one-year deal. He was the team's top scorer in the 2017–18 season with nine goals.

=== Olimpija Ljubljana ===
In June 2018, Kaluđerović joined Slovenian champions Olimpija Ljubljana, signing a two-year deal. He, however, spent just two months at the club, failing to make his official debut.

=== Delhi Dynamos ===
In August 2018, Kaluđerović signed with Indian Super League club Delhi Dynamos.

=== Inter Zaprešić ===
In January 2019, Kaluđerović signed with Croatian club Inter Zaprešić.

=== OFK Beograd ===
On 25 January 2024, Kaluđerović announced his retirement.

== International career ==
In UEFA competitions, Kaluđerović was capped for Serbia and Montenegro at under-19 level and Serbia at under-21 level. He was subsequently selected to represent Serbia at the 2008 Summer Olympics, but failed to make any appearances.

In April 2010, Kaluđerović made his full international debut for Serbia in a friendly match against Japan. He received his second call-up to the team for two friendlies against Mexico and Honduras in November 2011, appearing in both games with the latter ending up as his final international.

== Personal life ==
In January 2010, Kaluđerović married TV host Milica Stanišić.

== Career statistics ==
=== Club ===
Appearances and goals by club, season and competition
Club	Season	League			Cup		Continental		Total	
Club	Season	Division	Apps	Goals	Apps	Goals	Apps	Goals	Apps	Goals
OFK Beograd	2003–04	First League of Serbia and Montenegro	1	0	0	0	0	0	1	0
OFK Beograd	2004–05	First League of Serbia and Montenegro	0	0	1	0	0	0	1	0
OFK Beograd	2005–06	First League of Serbia and Montenegro	1	0	1	0	0	0	2	0
OFK Beograd	2006–07	Serbian SuperLiga	11	5	0	0	1	0	12	5
OFK Beograd	2007–08	Serbian SuperLiga	28	7	3	1	—		31	8
OFK Beograd	2008–09	Serbian SuperLiga	11	0	2	1	2	1	15	2
OFK Beograd	Total		52	12	7	2	3	1	62	15
Spartak Subotica (loan)	2005–06	Serbian First League	19	9	—		—		19	9
Spartak Subotica (loan)	2006–07	Serbian First League	11	2			—		11	2
Spartak Subotica (loan)	Total		30	11			—		30	11
Radnički Pirot (loan)	2006–07	Serbian First League	1	0	1	1	—		2	1
Rad	2008–09	Serbian SuperLiga	16	4	0	0	—		16	4
Rad	2009–10	Serbian SuperLiga	29	17	1	1	—		30	18
Rad	Total		45	21	1	1	—		46	22
Red Star Belgrade	2010–11	Serbian SuperLiga	28	13	5	7	0	0	33	20
Red Star Belgrade	2011–12	Serbian SuperLiga	15	6	3	1	4	3	22	10
Red Star Belgrade	Total		43	19	8	8	4	3	55	30
Beijing Guoan	2012	Chinese Super League	11	2	0	0	6	0	17	2
Racing Santander (loan)	2012–13	Segunda División	18	3	2	2	—		20	5
Vojvodina (loan)	2013–14	Serbian SuperLiga	15	5	2	2	4	1	21	8
AEL Limassol (loan)	2013–14	Cypriot First Division	18	5	1	0	—		19	5
Thun	2014–15	Swiss Super League	12	2	3	0	—		15	2
Brisbane Roar	2014–15	A-League	10	5	0	0	6	2	16	7
Rad	2015–16	Serbian SuperLiga	15	6	0	0	—		15	6
Žalgiris	2016	A Lyga	19	20	3	3	2	0	24	23
Port	2017	Thai League 1	9	3			—		9	3
Wellington Phoenix	2017–18	A-League	23	9	0	0	—		23	9
Olimpija Ljubljana	2018–19	Slovenian First League	0	0	0	0	0	0	0	0
Delhi Dynamos	2018–19	Indian Super League	12	1	0	0	—		12	1
Inter Zaprešić	2018–19	Croatian First League	8	0	1	0	—		9	0
RFS	2019	Latvian Higher League	10	2	2	0	2	0	14	2
Rad	2019–20	Serbian SuperLiga	9	7	0	0	—		9	7
Žalgiris	2020	A Lyga	9	4	2	2	2	1	13	7
Rad	2020–21	Serbian SuperLiga	19	9	0	0	—		19	9
Proleter Novi Sad	2021–22	Serbian SuperLiga	2	1	0	0	—		2	1
Nasaf	2021	Uzbekistan Super League	14	2	3	3	4	2	21	7
Proleter Novi Sad	2021–22	Serbian SuperLiga	14	0	0	0	—		14	0
Grafičar Beograd	2022–23	Serbian First League	18	5	0	0	—		18	5
OFK Beograd	2022–23	Serbian League Belgrade	14	10	—		—		14	10
OFK Beograd	2023–24	Serbian First League	1	0	0	0	—		1	0
OFK Beograd	Total		15	10	0	0	0	0	15	10
Career total			451	164	36	24	33	10	520	198

=== International ===
Appearances and goals by national team and year
National team	Year	Apps	Goals
Serbia	2010	1	0
Serbia	2011	2	0
Total		3	0

== Honours ==
OFK Beograd

- Serbia and Montenegro Cup runner-up: 2005–06

Žalgiris

- A Lyga: 2016
- Lithuanian Cup: 2016

Nasaf

- AFC Cup runner-up: 2021

Individual

- Serbian SuperLiga top scorer: 2010–11
- Serbian SuperLiga Team of the Season: 2010–11
- A Lyga top scorer: 2016
- Serbian SuperLiga Player of the Week: 2020–21 (Round 30)
