= Goran Paracki =

Croatian football player (born 1987)

Personal information
- Full name: Goran Paracki
- Date of birth: 21 January 1987 (age 39)
- Place of birth: Pula, Croatia
- Height: 1.78 m (5 ft 10 in)
- Positions: Midfielder; defender

Team information
- Current team: Karlovac 1919
- Number: 8

Youth career
- 2003–2006: Rijeka

Senior career*
Years	Team	Apps	(Gls)
2006	Rijeka	1	(0)
2007	→ Novalja (loan)		(1)
2007–2008	→ Rudar Labin (loan)		(2)
2008–2012	Karlovac	91	(7)
2012	Pécsi	6	(0)
2012–2014	RNK Split	39	(0)
2014	Inter Zaprešić	14	(0)
2014–2016	Slaven Belupo	54	(2)
2016–2017	Istra 1961	35	(1)
2017–2018	Wellington Phoenix	25	(1)
2018–2019	Neftchi Baku	22	(2)
2019–2022	Slaven Belupo	81	(0)
2022–	Karlovac 1919	110	(14)

International career
2005–2006	Croatia U19	10	(0)
- * Club domestic league appearances and goals as of 17 June 2026

Goran Paracki (born 21 January 1987) is a Croatian professional footballer who plays as a midfielder or defender for Karlovac 1919.

== Club career ==
Paracki was born in Pula, Croatia.

=== Wellington Phoenix ===
On 20 July 2017, Paracki signed a one-year deal with Wellington Phoenix.

=== Neftchi Baku ===
On 23 June 2018, Paracki signed a one-year contract with Neftçi PFK. Neftchi Baku confirmed Paracki's release on 15 May 2019.

=== Slaven Belupo ===
On 29 June 2019, Paracki returned to Slaven Belupo after four years.
