= 2018–19 Brisbane Roar FC season =

Brisbane Roar
2018–19 season
- Chairman: Rahim Soekasah
- Manager: John Aloisi (to 28 December 2018); Darren Davis (caretaker) (from 28 December 2018)
- Stadium: Suncorp Stadium, Brisbane
- A-League: 9th
- FFA Cup: Round of 32
- Top goalscorer: League: Adam Taggart (11 goals); All: Adam Taggart (11 goals)
- Highest home attendance: 15,129 vs Wellington Phoenix (28 October 2018)
- Lowest home attendance: 6,084 vs Wellington Phoenix (12 April 2019)
- Average home league attendance: 9,632
Home colours	Away colours

The 2018–19 Brisbane Roar FC season was the club's 14th season participating in the A-League and in the FFA Cup for the fifth time.

== Players ==
=== Squad information ===
Note: Flags indicate national team as defined under FIFA eligibility rules; some limited exceptions apply. Players may hold more than one non-FIFA nationality.

No.	Pos.	Nation	Player
1	GK	AUS	Brendan White
2	FW	NZL	Dane Ingham
3	DF	AUS	Luke DeVere
4	DF	AUS	Daniel Bowles
7	MF	DEN	Thomas Kristensen
8	MF	AUS	Jacob Pepper
10	FW	AUS	Brett Holman
11	FW	FRA	Éric Bauthéac
12	DF	AUS	Ruon Tongyik
13	MF	AUS	Stefan Mauk
14	MF	ESP	Álex López
15	DF	AUS	Stefan Nigro
16	FW	AUS	Charles Lokolingoy
17	MF	AUS	Matt McKay (Captain)

No.	Pos.	Nation	Player
18	MF	AUS	Joe Caletti
19	DF	AUS	Jack Hingert
21	GK	ENG	Jamie Young
22	MF	DEN	Tobias Mikkelsen
23	FW	AUS	Dylan Wenzel-Halls
24	DF	AUS	Connor O'Toole
26	FW	AUS	Nicholas D'Agostino
33	FW	BRA	Henrique
34	DF	AUS	Aaron Reardon
35	MF	AUS	Jay Barnett (Scholarship)
37	FW	AUS	Bryce Bafford (Scholarship)
38	FW	AUS	Izaack Powell (Scholarship)
92	FW	AUS	Eli Babalj (Injury replacement loan)

== Transfers ==
=== Transfers in ===
No.	Position	Player	Transferred from	Type/fee	Contract length	Date	Ref
9	FW	Adam Taggart	Perth Glory	Free transfer	2 years	1 May 2018	
23	FW	Dylan Wenzel-Halls	(Australia) Western Pride	Free transfer	1 year	4 May 2018	
13	MF	Stefan Mauk	(Netherlands) N.E.C.	€150,000	4 years	28 May 2018	
22	FW	(Denmark) Tobias Mikkelsen	(Denmark) Nordsjaelland	Free transfer	1 year	5 June 2018	
15	DF	Stefan Nigro		Free transfer	1 year	11 July 2018	
14	MF	(Spain) Álex López		Free transfer	1 year	28 September 2018	
16	FW	Charles Lokolingoy		Free transfer	6 months	6 February 2019	
12	DF	Ruon Tongyik		Free transfer	6 months	6 February 2019	
92	FW	Eli Babalj		Free transfer	5 months	6 March 2019	

=== Transfers out ===
No.	Position	Player	Transferred to	Type/fee	Date	Ref
14	MF	(Tunisia) Fahid Ben Khalfallah	Retired		20 April 2018	
9	FW	(Italy) Massimo Maccarone		End of contract	24 April 2018	
13	DF	Jade North		End of contract	26 April 2018	
5	DF	Corey Brown		End of contract	27 April 2018	
11	FW	Corey Gameiro		End of contract	3 May 2018	
16	MF	Mitchell Oxborrow		End of contract	3 May 2018	
77	DF	Ivan Franjic		End of contract	28 May 2018	
25	MF	Rahmat Akbari	Melbourne Victory	Loan	19 October 2018	
6	DF	(Greece) Avraam Papadopoulos	(Greece) Olympiacos	Mutual contract termination	28 January 2019	
9	FW	Adam Taggart	(South Korea) Suwon Samsung Bluewings	Undisclosed	14 February 2019	
20	FW	Shannon Brady	(Australia) Gold Coast Knights	Free transfer	11 March 2019	

=== From youth squad ===
N	Pos.	Nat.	Name	Age	Notes
34	DF	(Australia)	Aaron Reardon	19	Multi-year contract
38	DF	(Australia)	Izaack Powell	17	1 year scholarship contract

=== Contract extensions ===
No.	Position	Name	Duration	Date	Notes
24	DF	Connor O'Toole	3 years	24 April 2018	
17	MF	Matt McKay	1 year	27 April 2018	
19	DF	Jack Hingert	2 years	27 April 2018	
4	DF	Daniel Bowles	1 year	4 May 2018	
8	MF	Jacob Pepper	1 year	4 May 2018	
1	GK	Brendan White	1 year	4 May 2018	
33	FW	(Brazil) Henrique	1 year	4 May 2018	
10	FW	Brett Holman	1 year	17 May 2018	
26	FW	Nicholas D'Agostino	1 year	17 May 2018	
23	FW	Dylan Wenzel-Halls	2 years	14 February 2019	

== Technical staff ==
Position	Name
Manager	(Wales) Darren Davies
Assistant Manager	
Goalkeeping Coach	(Australia) Jason Kearton

== Squad statistics ==
=== Appearances and goals ===
N	Pos.	Nat.	Name	Total					A-League					FFA Cup
N	Pos.	Nat.	Name	Apps	Goals	Yellow card	Second yellow card	Red card	Apps	Goals	Yellow card	Second yellow card	Red card	Apps	Goals	Yellow card	Second yellow card	Red card
1	GK	(Australia)	Brendan White	4	0	0	0	0	3+1	0	0	0	0	0+0	0	0	0	0
2	FW	(New Zealand)	Dane Ingham	13	0	2	1	0	10+3	0	2	1	0	0+0	0	0	0	0
3	DF	(Australia)	Luke DeVere	5	1	2	0	0	5+0	1	2	0	0	0+0	0	0	0	0
4	DF	(Australia)	Daniel Bowles	15	0	9	0	1	12+2	0	8	0	1	1+0	0	1	0	0
7	MF	(Denmark)	Thomas Kristensen	18	0	1	0	0	16+1	0	1	0	0	1+0	0	0	0	0
8	MF	(Australia)	Jacob Pepper	22	0	9	0	0	20+1	0	9	0	0	1+0	0	0	0	0
10	FW	(Australia)	Brett Holman	0	0	0	0	0	0+0	0	0	0	0	0+0	0	0	0	0
11	FW	(France)	Éric Bauthéac	25	7	10	2	0	24+0	7	10	2	0	1+0	0	0	0	0
12	DF	(Australia)	Ruon Tongyik	7	0	0	0	0	7+0	0	0	0	0	0+0	0	0	0	0
13	MF	(Australia)	Stefan Mauk	6	0	1	0	1	4+1	0	1	0	1	1+0	0	0	0	0
14	MF	(Spain)	Álex López	25	3	5	0	0	25+0	3	5	0	0	0+0	0	0	0	0
15	DF	(Australia)	Stefan Nigro	9	0	1	0	0	6+3	0	1	0	0	0+0	0	0	0	0
16	FW	(Australia)	Charles Lokolingoy	5	0	2	0	0	0+5	0	2	0	0	0+0	0	0	0	0
17	MF	(Australia)	Matt McKay	25	1	5	0	0	23+1	1	5	0	0	1+0	0	0	0	0
18	MF	(Australia)	Joe Caletti	13	0	0	0	0	6+6	0	0	0	0	0+1	0	0	0	0
19	DF	(Australia)	Jack Hingert	17	0	4	0	0	16+0	0	4	0	0	1+0	0	0	0	0
21	GK	(England)	Jamie Young	25	0	1	0	0	24+0	0	1	0	0	1+0	0	0	0	0
22	FW	(Denmark)	Tobias Mikkelsen	19	3	0	0	0	10+8	3	0	0	0	1+0	0	0	0	0
23	FW	(Australia)	Dylan Wenzel-Halls	20	5	1	0	0	11+9	5	1	0	0	0+0	0	0	0	0
24	DF	(Australia)	Connor O'Toole	16	0	1	0	0	15+0	0	1	0	0	1+0	0	0	0	0
26	FW	(Australia)	Nicholas D'Agostino	17	1	2	0	0	6+11	1	2	0	0	0+0	0	0	0	0
27	MF	(Australia)	Adam Sawyer†	0	0	0	0	0	0+0	0	0	0	0	0+0	0	0	0	0
31	GK	(Australia)	Macklin Freke†	0	0	0	0	0	0+0	0	0	0	0	0+0	0	0	0	0
32	MF	(Australia)	Zachary Duncan†	4	1	1	0	0	3+1	1	1	0	0	0+0	0	0	0	0
33	FW	(Brazil)	Henrique	25	3	0	0	0	11+13	3	0	0	0	1+0	0	0	0	0
34	DF	(Australia)	Aaron Reardon	4	0	1	0	0	1+3	0	1	0	0	0+0	0	0	0	0
35	MF	(Australia)	Jay Barnett†	3	0	0	0	0	0+3	0	0	0	0	0+0	0	0	0	0
36	MF	(Australia)	Daniel Leck†	9	0	0	0	0	6+2	0	0	0	0	0+1	0	0	0	0
37	FW	(Australia)	Bryce Bafford†	0	0	0	0	0	0+0	0	0	0	0	0+0	0	0	0	0
38	FW	(Australia)	Izaack Powell†	6	0	2	0	0	4+2	0	2	0	0	0+0	0	0	0	0
92	FW	(Australia)	Eli Babalj	4	0	0	0	0	3+1	0	0	0	0	0+0	0	0	0	0
Players no longer at the club
6	DF	(Greece)	Avraam Papadopoulos	9	0	4	0	0	9+0	0	4	0	0	0+0	0	0	0	0
9	FW	(Australia)	Adam Taggart	19	11	1	0	0	17+1	11	1	0	0	0+1	0	0	0	0
20	FW	(Australia)	Shannon Brady	1	0	0	0	0	0+1	0	0	0	0	0+0	0	0	0	0

- Last updated: 25 April 2019
- Source: au.soccerway.com
- (yellow card) = Number of bookings; (second yellow card) = Number of sending offs after a second yellow card; (red card) = Number of sending offs by a direct red card.

† = Scholarship or NPL/NYL-listed player

== Pre-season and friendlies ==
Win Draw Loss

=== Friendlies ===
27 June 2018	Logan Lightning (Australia)	0–4	(Australia) Brisbane Roar	Logan
19:30 AEST		Report	Reardon 15'; Duncan 36'; Bauthéac 56', 85'	Stadium: Logan Metro Sports Park

12 July 2018	Magpies Crusaders United (Australia)	0–5	(Australia) Brisbane Roar	Mackay
19:00 AEST		Report	Bauthéac 12' (pen.); Henrique 49' (pen.), 83'; Muratovic 78'; Sawyer 85'	Stadium: BB Print Stadium; Attendance: 3,122; Referee: Jarred Gillett

31 July 2018	Wellington Phoenix (New Zealand)	1–2	(Australia) Brisbane Roar	Gold Coast
	Burns	Report	Bauthéac; Taggart	Stadium: Cbus Super Stadium; Referee: Chris Beath

15 August 2018	Brisbane Roar (Australia)	1–1	(Australia) Sydney FC	Gold Coast
	Mauk 78'	Report	Buhagiar 17'	Stadium: Cbus Super Stadium; Attendance: 0 (behind closed doors); Referee: Alex King

1 September 2018	Melbourne Victory (Australia)	1–1	(Australia) Brisbane Roar	Morwell
14:30 AEST	Broxham 20'	Report	Taggart 22'	Stadium: Latrobe City Sports & Entertainment Centre; Attendance: 1,638; Referee: Kate Jacewicz

15 September 2018	Peninsula Power (Australia)	2–3	(Australia) Brisbane Roar	Brisbane
17:00 AEST	Plummer 16'; Strickland 85'	Report	Taggart 20', 29'; 47' (o.g.)	Stadium: A.J. Kelly Park

25 September 2018	Melbourne City (Australia)	1–1	(Australia) Brisbane Roar	Melbourne
	Vidosic 55' (pen.)	Report	Henrique 6'	Stadium: City Football Academy

29 September 2018	Brisbane Roar (Australia)	3–0	(Australia) BPL Select	Logan
	Taggart 14'; Mikkelsen 75'; Wenzel-Halls 78'	Report		Stadium: Logan Metro Sports Park

4 October 2018	Brisbane Roar (Australia)	1–1	Australia U20	Logan
12:00 AEST		Report		Stadium: Logan Metro Sports Park; Attendance: 0 (behind closed doors)

== Competitions ==
=== Overall ===
Competition	Started round	Final position / round	First match	Last match
A-League	—	9th	21 October 2018	25 April 2019
FFA Cup	Round of 32	Round of 32	7 August 2018	7 August 2018

=== A-League ===
==== League table ====
Pos	Team	Pld	W	D	L	GF	GA	GD	Pts	Qualification
1	Perth Glory	27	18	6	3	56	23	+33	60	Qualification for 2020 AFC Champions League group stage and Finals series (Note: The top two teams enter the Finals series at the semi-finals, while the teams ranked third to sixth enter the Finals series at the elimination-finals.)
2	Sydney FC (C)	27	16	4	7	43	29	+14	52	Qualification for 2020 AFC Champions League group stage and Finals series
3	Melbourne Victory	27	15	5	7	50	32	+18	50	Qualification for 2020 AFC Champions League preliminary round 2 and Finals series
4	Adelaide United	27	12	8	7	37	32	+5	44	Qualification for Finals series
5	Melbourne City	27	11	7	9	39	32	+7	40	Qualification for Finals series
6	Wellington Phoenix (Note: Wellington Phoenix cannot qualify for the AFC Champions League as they are not recognised as an AFC club.)	27	11	7	9	46	43	+3	40	Qualification for Finals series
7	Newcastle Jets	27	10	5	12	40	36	+4	35	
8	Western Sydney Wanderers	27	6	6	15	42	54	−12	24	
9	Brisbane Roar	27	4	6	17	38	71	−33	18	
10	Central Coast Mariners	27	3	4	20	31	70	−39	13	

Source: A-Leagues
Rules for classification: 1) points; 2) goal difference; 3) number of goals scored.
(C) Champions

==== Results summary ====
Overall								Home						Away					
Pld	W	D	L	GF	GA	GD	Pts	W	D	L	GF	GA	GD	W	D	L	GF	GA	GD
27	4	6	17	38	71	−33	18	3	3	7	19	36	−17	1	3	10	19	35	−16

Source: ultimatealeague.com

==== Results by round ====
Round	1	2	3	4	5	6	7	8	9	10	11	12	13	14	15	16	17	18	19	20	21	22	23	24	25	26	27
Ground	H	H	A	A	H	A	A	H	A	A	H	A	A	A	H	H	A	H	A	A	H	A	H	A	H	H	H
Result	D	D	L	D	W	L	L	L	L	L	L	D	L	D	L	D	L	W	L	W	L	L	L	L	W	L	L
Position	4	7	8	8	6	6	9	9	9	9	9	9	9	9	9	9	9	9	9	9	9	9	9	9	9	9	9

Source: ultimatealeague.com
A = Away; H = Home; W = Win; D = Draw; L = Loss

==== Matches ====
Win Draw Loss

21 October 2018 1	Brisbane Roar	1–1	Central Coast Mariners	Brisbane
16:00 AEST	Taggart 65'	Report	Pain 4'	Stadium: Suncorp Stadium; Attendance: 14,859; Referee: Chris Beath

28 October 2018 2	Brisbane Roar	0–0	Wellington Phoenix	Brisbane
16:00 AEST		Report		Stadium: Suncorp Stadium; Attendance: 15,129; Referee: Alex King

3 November 2018 3	Perth Glory	2–1	Brisbane Roar	Perth
19:00 AWST	Keogh 15'; O'Toole 63' (o.g.)	Report	Taggart 84' (pen.)	Stadium: nib Stadium; Attendance: 9,446; Referee: Daniel Elder

10 November 2018 4	Western Sydney Wanderers	2–2	Brisbane Roar	Mudgee
17:35	Riera 10', 17'	Report	López 37'; Taggart 48' (pen.)	Stadium: Glen Willow Sporting Field; Attendance: 5,067; Referee: Jonathan Barreiro

24 November 2018 5	Brisbane Roar	2–0	Melbourne City	Brisbane
18:50 AEST	Taggart 27', 66'	Report		Stadium: Suncorp Stadium; Attendance: 9,925; Referee: Ryuji Sato (Japan)

30 November 2018 6	Adelaide United	2–1	Brisbane Roar	Adelaide
19:20 ACDT	Halloran 43', 49'	Report	Henrique 67'	Stadium: Coopers Stadium; Attendance: 8,005; Referee: Jarred Gillett

9 December 2018 7	Newcastle Jets	2–0	Brisbane Roar	Newcastle
17:00 AEDT	Sheppard 45+1'; Jair 58'	Report		Stadium: McDonald Jones Stadium; Attendance: 9,719; Referee: Kurt Ams

14 December 2018 8	Brisbane Roar	2–4	Melbourne Victory	Brisbane
18:50 AEST	Taggart 27' (pen.); Toivonen 42' (o.g.)	Report	Barbarouses 13', 45+2'; Toivonen 32'; Honda 40' (pen.)	Stadium: Suncorp Stadium; Attendance: 10,289; Referee: Adam Fielding

22 December 2018 9	Wellington Phoenix	4–1	Brisbane Roar	Wellington
19:35 NZDT	Papadopoulos 35' (o.g.); Williams 75'; Krishna 80' (pen.); Singh 90+3'	Report	Henrique 45+1'	Stadium: Westpac Stadium; Attendance: 6,841; Referee: Kurt Ams

29 December 2018 10	Sydney FC	2–1	Brisbane Roar	Sydney
19:50 AEDT	Le Fondre 16', 55'	Report	McKay 35'	Stadium: Jubilee Oval; Attendance: 12,216; Referee: Alex King

2 January 2019 12	Newcastle Jets	2–2	Brisbane Roar	Newcastle
19:50 AEDT	D. Petratos 5'; O'Donovan 67'	Report	Taggart 65'; Bauthéac 87'	Stadium: McDonald Jones Stadium; Attendance: 8,519; Referee: Shaun Evans

6 January 2019 11	Brisbane Roar	2–4	Perth Glory	Brisbane
18:00 AEST	Taggart 22', 40'	Report	Kilkenny 59' (pen.), 81' (pen.); Reardon 85' (o.g.); Keogh 87'	Stadium: Suncorp Stadium; Attendance: 9,429; Referee: Adam Kersey

11 January 2019 13	Melbourne City	1–0	Brisbane Roar	Melbourne
19:50 AEDT	De Laet 52'	Report		Stadium: AAMI Park; Attendance: 6,348; Referee: Stephen Lucas

15 January 2019 15	Brisbane Roar	0–5	Melbourne Victory	Brisbane
18:50 AEST		Report	Toivonen 15'; Barbarouses 48' (pen.), 72', 87'; Roux 65'	Stadium: Suncorp Stadium; Attendance: 7,131; Referee: Jonathan Barreiro

20 January 2019 14	Central Coast Mariners	1–1	Brisbane Roar	Gosford
19:00 AEDT	Millar 3'	Report	DeVere 45+1'	Stadium: Central Coast Stadium; Attendance: 4,873; Referee: Matthew Conger

25 January 2019 16	Brisbane Roar	2–2	Western Sydney Wanderers	Brisbane
18:50 AEST	Mikkelsen 90+2'; Taggart 90+6'	Report	Bonevacia 18'; Yeboah 42'	Stadium: Suncorp Stadium; Attendance: 8,053; Referee: Adam Fielding

2 February 2019 17	Adelaide United	4–3	Brisbane Roar	Adelaide
19:20 ACDT	Isaías 45+2'; Goodwin 67'; Blackwood 75'; Mileusnic 90+7'	Report	Henrique 19'; Wenzel-Halls 38'; Taggart 43'	Stadium: Coopers Stadium; Attendance: 7,071; Referee: Alex King

8 February 2019 18	Brisbane Roar	2–1	Sydney FC	Brisbane
18:50 AEST	Mikkelsen 77'; Wenzel-Halls 90'	Report	De Silva 55'	Stadium: Suncorp Stadium; Attendance: 8,356; Referee: Jonathan Barreiro

16 February 2019 19	Perth Glory	4–0	Brisbane Roar	Perth
19:00 AWST	Davidson 19'; Keogh 35', 45+3'; Castro 54'			Stadium: HBF Park; Attendance: 10,831; Referee: Shaun Evans

22 February 2019 20	Central Coast Mariners	3–5	Brisbane Roar	Gosford
19:50 AEDT	Pain 38'; O'Neill 45+2'; Murray 82'	Report	Bauthéac 31'; López 36', 54'; Mikkelsen 45'; Wenzel-Halls 74'	Stadium: Central Coast Stadium; Referee: Stephan Lucas

8 March 2019 21	Brisbane Roar	1–4	Western Sydney Wanderers	Brisbane
18:50 AEST	Wenzel-Halls 7'	Report	Duke 15'; Riera 35', 38'; Bonevacia 90+2'	Stadium: Suncorp Stadium; Attendance: 8,130; Referee: Jarred Gillett

16 March 2019 22	Melbourne Victory	2–1	Brisbane Roar	Melbourne
19:50 AEDT	Barbarouses 24', 39'	Report	Bauthéac 50'	Stadium: Marvel Stadium; Attendance: 16,357; Referee: Chris Beath

29 March 2019 23	Brisbane Roar	1–3	Sydney FC	Brisbane
18:50 AEST	Bauthéac 68'	Report	Calver 1'; Le Fondre 77'; de Jong 89'	Stadium: Suncorp Stadium; Attendance: 8,059; Referee: Stephan Lucas

5 April 2019 24	Melbourne City	4–1	Brisbane Roar	Melbourne
19:50 AEDT	Griffiths 27'; Harrison 59'; de Laet 70'; McGree 90+4'	Report	Delbridge 54' (o.g.)	Stadium: AAMI Park; Attendance: 5,012; Referee: Adam Kersey

12 April 2019 25	Brisbane Roar	2–1	Wellington Phoenix	Brisbane
19:50 AEDT	Bauthéac 37', 42'	Report	Taylor 53'	Stadium: Suncorp Stadium; Attendance: 6,084; Referee: Peter Green

20 April 2019 26	Brisbane Roar	1–6	Newcastle Jets	Brisbane
17:35 AEST	Duncan 49'	Report	Champness 23', 68'; O'Donovan 27', 55'; Petratos 65'; Appiah 90'	Stadium: Suncorp Stadium; Attendance: 7,985; Referee: Alex King

25 April 2019 27	Brisbane Roar	3–5	Adelaide United	Brisbane
14:00 AEST	Wenzel-Halls 35'; D'Agostino 45'; Bauthéac 61' (pen.)	Report	Mileusnic 4'; Blackwood 51'; Goodwin 71'; Diawara 76'; Isaias 85'	Stadium: Suncorp Stadium; Attendance: 11,790; Referee: Shaun Evans

=== FFA Cup ===
7 August 2018 Round of 32	Brisbane Roar (Queensland)	0–1	(Victoria (state)) Melbourne City	Brisbane
19:30 AEST		Report	Fornaroli 120'	Stadium: Dolphin Oval; Attendance: 6,151; Referee: Casey Reibelt
