= 2017–18 Brisbane Roar FC season =

Brisbane Roar
2017–18 season
- Chairman: Rahim Soekasah
- Manager: John Aloisi
- Stadium: Suncorp Stadium, Brisbane
- A-League: 6th
- A-League Finals Series: Elimination-finals
- FFA Cup: Round of 32
- AFC Champions League: Preliminary round 2
- Top goalscorer: League: Massimo Maccarone (9 goals); All: Massimo Maccarone (10 goals)
- Highest home attendance: 11,485 vs Central Coast Mariners (5 November 2017)
- Lowest home attendance: 5,192 vs Wellington Phoenix (9 December 2017)
- Average home league attendance: 9,093
| Home colours | Away colours | Third colours |

The 2017–18 Brisbane Roar FC season was the club's thirteenth season participating in the A-League, in the FFA Cup for the fourth time, as well as the AFC Champions League for the fifth time.

== Players ==
=== Squad information ===
Correct as of 3 April 2018 – players' numbers as per the official Brisbane Roar website

Note: Flags indicate national team as defined under FIFA eligibility rules; some limited exceptions apply. Players may hold more than one non-FIFA nationality.

| No. | Pos. | Nation | Player |
|---|---|---|---|
| 3 | DF | AUS | Luke DeVere |
| 4 | DF | AUS | Daniel Bowles |
| 5 | DF | AUS | Corey Brown |
| 6 | DF | GRE | Avraam Papadopoulos |
| 7 | MF | DEN | Thomas Kristensen |
| 8 | MF | AUS | Jacob Pepper |
| 9 | FW | ITA | Massimo Maccarone |
| 10 | MF | AUS | Brett Holman |
| 11 | FW | AUS | Corey Gameiro |
| 12 | FW | NZL | Dane Ingham |
| 13 | DF | AUS | Jade North (Vice-captain) |
| 14 | FW | TUN | Fahid Ben Khalfallah |
| 16 | MF | AUS | Mitchell Oxborrow |
| 17 | MF | AUS | Matt McKay (Captain) |

| No. | Pos. | Nation | Player |
|---|---|---|---|
| 18 | MF | AUS | Joe Caletti |
| 19 | DF | AUS | Jack Hingert |
| 20 | FW | AUS | Shannon Brady |
| 21 | GK | ENG | Jamie Young |
| 22 | MF | FRA | Éric Bauthéac |
| 24 | DF | AUS | Connor O'Toole |
| 26 | FW | AUS | Nicholas D'Agostino |
| 28 | MF | AUS | Emilio Martinez (Scholarship) |
| 31 | GK | AUS | Brendan White (Mature-age rookie) |
| 33 | FW | BRA | Henrique |
| 35 | MF | AUS | Jay Barnett (Scholarship) |
| 37 | MF | AUS | Bryce Bafford (Scholarship) |
| 77 | DF | AUS | Ivan Franjic |

=== From youth squad ===
| N | Pos. | Nat. | Name | Age | Notes |

=== Transfers in ===
| No. | Position | Player | Transferred from | Type/fee | Contract length | Date | Ref |
|---|---|---|---|---|---|---|---|
| 14 | FW | (Tunisia) Fahid Ben Khalfallah | | Free transfer | 1 year | 26 May 2017 | |
| 11 | FW | Corey Gameiro | | Free transfer | 1 year | 4 July 2017 | |
| 9 | FW | (Italy) Massimo Maccarone | | Free transfer | 1 year | 17 July 2017 | |
| 16 | MF | Mitchell Oxborrow | (Australia) Broadmeadow Magic | Free transfer | 1 year | 4 August 2017 | |
| 28 | MF | Emilio Martinez | | Free transfer | 1 year | 6 August 2017 | |
| 33 | FW | Peter Skapetis | | Injury replacement | | 9 August 2017 | |
| 22 | MF | (France) Éric Bauthéac | | Free transfer | 1 year | 9 September 2017 | |
| 37 | MF | Bryce Bafford | (Australia) Australian Institute of Sport | Free transfer | | 18 October 2017 | |
| 35 | MF | Jay Barnett | (Australia) Australian Institute of Sport | Free transfer | | 18 October 2017 | |
| 31 | GK | Brendan White | (Australia) Port Melbourne | Free transfer | | 4 November 2017 | |
| 77 | DF | Ivan Franjic | | Free transfer | 1 year | 9 November 2017 | |
| 33 | FW | (Brazil) Henrique | | Free transfer | | 22 February 2018 | |

=== Transfers out ===
| No. | Position | Player | Transferred to | Type/fee | Date | Ref |
|---|---|---|---|---|---|---|
| 22 | MF | (Germany) Thomas Broich | | End of contract | 19 April 2017 | |
| 28 | FW | Brandon Borrello | (Germany) 1. FC Kaiserslautern | $450,000 | 9 May 2017 | |
| 9 | FW | Jamie Maclaren | | End of contract | 16 May 2017 | |
| 15 | MF | (Spain) Manuel Arana | (India) FC Goa | End of contract | 17 May 2017 | |
| 16 | MF | Nathan Konstandopoulos | | End of contract | 17 May 2017 | |
| 33 | FW | Joey Katebian | | End of contract | 17 May 2017 | |
| 46 | DF | Cameron Crestani | | End of contract | 17 May 2017 | |
| 11 | MF | Tommy Oar | (Cyprus) APOEL | $515,000 | 19 June 2017 | |
| 25 | DF | Kye Rowles | Central Coast Mariners | Free transfer | 26 June 2017 | |
| 33 | FW | Peter Skapetis | Central Coast Mariners | Free transfer | 18 January 2018 | |
| 1 | GK | Michael Theo | | Free transfer | 27 March 2018 | |

=== Contract extensions ===
| No. | Name | Position | Duration | Date | Notes |
|---|---|---|---|---|---|
| 1 | Michael Theo | Goalkeeper | 1 year | 22 June 2017 | |
| 6 | (Greece) Avraam Papadopoulos | Centre back | 1 year | 22 June 2017 | |
| 8 | Jacob Pepper | Central midfielder | 1 year | 30 June 2017 | |
| 18 | Joe Caletti | Central midfielder | 1 year | 30 June 2017 | |
| 12 | (New Zealand) Dane Ingham | Forward | 1 year | 6 July 2017 | |
| 33 | Peter Skapetis | Striker | 1 year | 31 August 2017 | |
| 21 | (England) Jamie Young | Goalkeeper | 2 years | 23 March 2018 | |

== Technical staff ==
| Position | Name |
|---|---|
| Manager | (Australia) John Aloisi |
| Assistant manager | (Australia) Ross Aloisi |
| Goalkeeping coach | (Australia) Jason Kearton |
| Youth coach | (Australia) Josh McCloughan |
| Strength & Conditioning Coach | (Australia) Karl Dodd |
| Physiotherapist | (Australia) Tony Ganter |

== Statistics ==
=== Squad statistics ===
| N | Pos. | Nat. | Name | Total | | | | | A-League | | | | | A-League Finals Series | | | | | FFA Cup | | | | | AFC Champions League |
| N | Pos. | Nat. | Name | Apps | Goals | Yellow card | Second yellow card | Red card | Apps | Goals | Yellow card | Second yellow card | Red card | Apps | Goals | Yellow card | Second yellow card | Red card | Apps | Goals | Yellow card | Second yellow card | Red card | Apps | Goals | Yellow card | Second yellow card | Red card |
|---|---|---|---|---|---|---|---|---|---|---|---|---|---|---|---|---|---|---|---|---|---|---|---|---|---|---|---|---|
| 3 | DF | (Australia) | Luke DeVere | 9 | 0 | 2 | 0 | 0 | 8+1 | 0 | 2 | 0 | 0 | 0+0 | 0 | 0 | 0 | 0 | 0+0 | 0 | 0 | 0 | 0 | 0+0 | 0 | 0 | 0 | 0 |
| 4 | DF | (Australia) | Daniel Bowles | 13 | 0 | 4 | 0 | 0 | 8+4 | 0 | 3 | 0 | 0 | 0+0 | 0 | 0 | 0 | 0 | 0+0 | 0 | 0 | 0 | 0 | 1+0 | 0 | 1 | 0 | 0 |
| 5 | DF | (Australia) | Corey Brown | 13 | 0 | 5 | 0 | 0 | 9+2 | 0 | 5 | 0 | 0 | 0+1 | 0 | 0 | 0 | 0 | 1+0 | 0 | 0 | 0 | 0 | 0+0 | 0 | 0 | 0 | 0 |
| 6 | DF | (Greece) | Avraam Papadopoulos | 16 | 4 | 5 | 0 | 1 | 15+0 | 4 | 4 | 0 | 1 | 0+0 | 0 | 0 | 0 | 0 | 0+0 | 0 | 0 | 0 | 0 | 1+0 | 0 | 1 | 0 | 0 |
| 7 | MF | (Denmark) | Thomas Kristensen | 19 | 2 | 5 | 0 | 0 | 16+1 | 2 | 5 | 0 | 0 | 1+0 | 0 | 0 | 0 | 0 | 1+0 | 0 | 0 | 0 | 0 | 0+0 | 0 | 0 | 0 | 0 |
| 8 | MF | (Australia) | Jacob Pepper | 19 | 1 | 5 | 0 | 0 | 17+1 | 1 | 4 | 0 | 0 | 1+0 | 0 | 1 | 0 | 0 | 0+0 | 0 | 0 | 0 | 0 | 0+0 | 0 | 0 | 0 | 0 |
| 9 | FW | (Italy) | Massimo Maccarone | 30 | 10 | 2 | 0 | 0 | 27+0 | 9 | 1 | 0 | 0 | 1+0 | 0 | 0 | 0 | 0 | 0+1 | 0 | 0 | 0 | 0 | 1+0 | 1 | 1 | 0 | 0 |
| 10 | MF | (Australia) | Brett Holman | 19 | 5 | 1 | 0 | 0 | 13+4 | 5 | 1 | 0 | 0 | 0+0 | 0 | 0 | 0 | 0 | 1+0 | 0 | 0 | 0 | 0 | 1+0 | 0 | 0 | 0 | 0 |
| 11 | FW | (Australia) | Corey Gameiro | 18 | 0 | 2 | 0 | 0 | 2+15 | 0 | 2 | 0 | 0 | 0+1 | 0 | 0 | 0 | 0 | 0+0 | 0 | 0 | 0 | 0 | 0+0 | 0 | 0 | 0 | 0 |
| 12 | FW | (New Zealand) | Dane Ingham | 5 | 0 | 1 | 0 | 0 | 2+1 | 0 | 0 | 0 | 0 | 0+0 | 0 | 0 | 0 | 0 | 1+0 | 0 | 1 | 0 | 0 | 1+0 | 0 | 0 | 0 | 0 |
| 13 | DF | (Australia) | Jade North | 11 | 0 | 3 | 0 | 0 | 9+0 | 0 | 2 | 0 | 0 | 0+0 | 0 | 0 | 0 | 0 | 1+0 | 0 | 0 | 0 | 0 | 0+1 | 0 | 1 | 0 | 0 |
| 14 | FW | (Tunisia) | Fahid Ben Khalfallah | 25 | 1 | 7 | 0 | 0 | 22+1 | 1 | 7 | 0 | 0 | 1+0 | 0 | 0 | 0 | 0 | 0+0 | 0 | 0 | 0 | 0 | 1+0 | 0 | 0 | 0 | 0 |
| 16 | MF | (Australia) | Mitchell Oxborrow | 19 | 0 | 5 | 0 | 0 | 4+12 | 0 | 4 | 0 | 0 | 0+1 | 0 | 0 | 0 | 0 | 0+1 | 0 | 0 | 0 | 0 | 1+0 | 0 | 1 | 0 | 0 |
| 17 | MF | (Australia) | Matt McKay | 28 | 2 | 3 | 0 | 1 | 25+0 | 2 | 3 | 0 | 1 | 1+0 | 0 | 0 | 0 | 0 | 1+0 | 0 | 0 | 0 | 0 | 1+0 | 0 | 0 | 0 | 0 |
| 18 | MF | (Australia) | Joe Caletti | 10 | 0 | 1 | 0 | 0 | 8+1 | 0 | 1 | 0 | 0 | 0+0 | 0 | 0 | 0 | 0 | 1+0 | 0 | 0 | 0 | 0 | 0+0 | 0 | 0 | 0 | 0 |
| 19 | DF | (Australia) | Jack Hingert | 29 | 1 | 5 | 0 | 0 | 24+2 | 1 | 5 | 0 | 0 | 1+0 | 0 | 0 | 0 | 0 | 1+0 | 0 | 0 | 0 | 0 | 1+0 | 0 | 0 | 0 | 0 |
| 20 | FW | (Australia) | Shannon Brady | 5 | 0 | 0 | 0 | 0 | 0+3 | 0 | 0 | 0 | 0 | 0+0 | 0 | 0 | 0 | 0 | 1+0 | 0 | 0 | 0 | 0 | 0+1 | 0 | 0 | 0 | 0 |
| 21 | GK | (England) | Jamie Young | 26 | 0 | 0 | 0 | 0 | 23+0 | 0 | 0 | 0 | 0 | 1+0 | 0 | 0 | 0 | 0 | 1+0 | 0 | 0 | 0 | 0 | 1+0 | 0 | 0 | 0 | 0 |
| 22 | MF | (France) | Éric Bauthéac | 22 | 3 | 7 | 0 | 0 | 19+1 | 2 | 5 | 0 | 0 | 1+0 | 0 | 1 | 0 | 0 | 0+0 | 0 | 0 | 0 | 0 | 0+1 | 1 | 1 | 0 | 0 |
| 24 | DF | (Australia) | Connor O'Toole | 14 | 0 | 1 | 0 | 0 | 9+4 | 0 | 1 | 0 | 0 | 1+0 | 0 | 0 | 0 | 0 | 0+0 | 0 | 0 | 0 | 0 | 0+0 | 0 | 0 | 0 | 0 |
| 25 | FW | (Australia) | Rahmat Akbari | 6 | 0 | 0 | 0 | 0 | 1+5 | 0 | 0 | 0 | 0 | 0+0 | 0 | 0 | 0 | 0 | 0+0 | 0 | 0 | 0 | 0 | 0+0 | 0 | 0 | 0 | 0 |
| 26 | FW | (Australia) | Nicholas D'Agostino | 9 | 0 | 3 | 0 | 0 | 6+2 | 0 | 2 | 0 | 0 | 0+0 | 0 | 0 | 0 | 0 | 1+0 | 0 | 1 | 0 | 0 | 0+0 | 0 | 0 | 0 | 0 |
| 27 | MF | (Australia) | Adam Sawyer | 1 | 0 | 0 | 0 | 0 | 0+1 | 0 | 0 | 0 | 0 | 0+0 | 0 | 0 | 0 | 0 | 0+0 | 0 | 0 | 0 | 0 | 0+0 | 0 | 0 | 0 | 0 |
| 28 | MF | (Australia) | Emilio Martinez | 0 | 0 | 0 | 0 | 0 | 0+0 | 0 | 0 | 0 | 0 | 0+0 | 0 | 0 | 0 | 0 | 0+0 | 0 | 0 | 0 | 0 | 0+0 | 0 | 0 | 0 | 0 |
| 31 | GK | (Australia) | Brendan White | 0 | 0 | 0 | 0 | 0 | 0+0 | 0 | 0 | 0 | 0 | 0+0 | 0 | 0 | 0 | 0 | 0+0 | 0 | 0 | 0 | 0 | 0+0 | 0 | 0 | 0 | 0 |
| 33 | FW | (Brazil) | Henrique | 8 | 3 | 0 | 0 | 0 | 2+5 | 3 | 0 | 0 | 0 | 1+0 | 0 | 0 | 0 | 0 | 0+0 | 0 | 0 | 0 | 0 | 0+0 | 0 | 0 | 0 | 0 |
| 35 | MF | (Australia) | Jay Barnett | 0 | 0 | 0 | 0 | 0 | 0+0 | 0 | 0 | 0 | 0 | 0+0 | 0 | 0 | 0 | 0 | 0+0 | 0 | 0 | 0 | 0 | 0+0 | 0 | 0 | 0 | 0 |
| 36 | MF | (Australia) | Daniel Leck | 6 | 0 | 0 | 0 | 0 | 4+2 | 0 | 0 | 0 | 0 | 0+0 | 0 | 0 | 0 | 0 | 0+0 | 0 | 0 | 0 | 0 | 0+0 | 0 | 0 | 0 | 0 |
| 37 | MF | (Australia) | Bryce Bafford | 0 | 0 | 0 | 0 | 0 | 0+0 | 0 | 0 | 0 | 0 | 0+0 | 0 | 0 | 0 | 0 | 0+0 | 0 | 0 | 0 | 0 | 0+0 | 0 | 0 | 0 | 0 |
| 43 | GK | (Australia) | Tomislav Bilic | 0 | 0 | 0 | 0 | 0 | 0+0 | 0 | 0 | 0 | 0 | 0+0 | 0 | 0 | 0 | 0 | 0+0 | 0 | 0 | 0 | 0 | 0+0 | 0 | 0 | 0 | 0 |
| 77 | DF | (Australia) | Ivan Franjic | 17 | 2 | 3 | 0 | 0 | 11+4 | 2 | 2 | 0 | 0 | 1+0 | 0 | 0 | 0 | 0 | 0+0 | 0 | 0 | 0 | 0 | 1+0 | 0 | 1 | 0 | 0 |
Players no longer at the club:
| 1 | GK | (Australia) | Michael Theo | 4 | 0 | 0 | 0 | 0 | 4+0 | 0 | 0 | 0 | 0 | 0+0 | 0 | 0 | 0 | 0 | 0+0 | 0 | 0 | 0 | 0 | 0+0 | 0 | 0 | 0 | 0 |
| 33 | FW | (Australia) | Peter Skapetis | 15 | 1 | 2 | 0 | 0 | 9+5 | 0 | 2 | 0 | 0 | 0+0 | 0 | 0 | 0 | 0 | 0+1 | 1 | 0 | 0 | 0 | 0+0 | 0 | 0 | 0 | 0 |

- Last updated: 20 April 2018
- Source: au.soccerway.com
- (yellow card) = Number of bookings; (second yellow card) = Number of sending offs after a second yellow card; (red card) = Number of sending offs by a direct red card.

== Pre-season and friendlies ==
| 25 July 2017 Heritage Shield | Queensland Lions (Australia) | 0–2 | (Australia) Brisbane Roar | Brisbane, Australia |
| 19:00 AEST | | Report | Brady 61'; Akbari 90' | Stadium: Richland Stadium |

| 5 August 2017 | Peninsula Power (Australia) | 2–4 | (Australia) Brisbane Roar | Brisbane, Australia |
| 15:00 AEST | Briggs 2'; Strickland 38' | Report | Skapetis 30'; D'Agostino 69'; Maccarone 75' (pen.), 88' | Stadium: A.J. Kelly Park |

| 18 August 2017 | Brisbane Roar (Australia) | 0–4 | (Australia) Western Sydney Wanderers | Gold Coast, Australia |
| 15:00 AEST | | Report | Scott 33'; Sotirio 48', 55'; Majok 60' | Stadium: Cbus Super Stadium; Attendance: 0 (behind closed doors) |

| 28 August 2017 | Brisbane Roar (Australia) | 2–1 | China U-23 | Gold Coast, Australia |
| 19:30 AEST | Skapetis 9'; Maccarone 88' (pen.) | Report | Wei 18' | Stadium: Cbus Super Stadium; Referee: Adam Kersey |

| 1 September 2017 | Melbourne Victory (Australia) | 3–1 | (Australia) Brisbane Roar | Ballarat, Australia |
| 19:30 AEST | Berisha 14', 66'; J. Ingham 19' | Report | Skapetis 31' | Stadium: Morshead Park Stadium |

| 9 September 2017 | Olympic FC (Australia) | 0–3 | (Australia) Brisbane Roar | Brisbane, Australia |
| 17:00 AEST | | Report | Skapetis 20'; Maccarone 79'; Brady 81' | Stadium: Goodwin Park |

| 16 September 2017 | Sydney FC (Australia) | 0–2 | (Australia) Brisbane Roar | Sydney, Australia |
| | | Report | Maccarone; Skapetis | Stadium: Macquarie University |

== Competitions ==
=== Overall ===
| Competition | Started round | Final position / round | First match | Last match |
|---|---|---|---|---|
| A-League | — | 6th | 6 October 2017 | 14 April 2018 |
| A-League Finals | Elimination-finals | Elimination-finals | 20 April 2018 | 20 April 2018 |
| FFA Cup | Round of 32 | Round of 32 | 9 August 2017 | 9 August 2017 |
| AFC Champions League | Preliminary round 2 | Preliminary round 2 | 23 January 2018 | 23 January 2018 |

=== A-League ===
==== League table ====
| Pos | Team | Pld | W | D | L | GF | GA | GD | Pts | Qualification |
|---|---|---|---|---|---|---|---|---|---|---|
| 1 | Sydney FC | 27 | 20 | 4 | 3 | 64 | 22 | +42 | 64 | Qualification for 2019 AFC Champions League group stage and Finals series |
| 2 | Newcastle Jets | 27 | 15 | 5 | 7 | 57 | 37 | +20 | 50 | Qualification for 2019 AFC Champions League second preliminary round and Finals series |
| 3 | Melbourne City | 27 | 13 | 4 | 10 | 41 | 33 | +8 | 43 | Qualification for Finals series |
| 4 | Melbourne Victory (C) | 27 | 12 | 5 | 10 | 43 | 37 | +6 | 41 | Qualification for 2019 AFC Champions League group stage and Finals series |
| 5 | Adelaide United | 27 | 11 | 6 | 10 | 36 | 38 | −2 | 39 | Qualification for Finals series |
| 6 | Brisbane Roar | 27 | 10 | 5 | 12 | 33 | 40 | −7 | 35 | Qualification for Finals series |
| 7 | Western Sydney Wanderers | 27 | 8 | 9 | 10 | 38 | 47 | −9 | 33 | |
| 8 | Perth Glory | 27 | 10 | 2 | 15 | 37 | 50 | −13 | 32 | |
| 9 | Wellington Phoenix (Note: Wellington Phoenix cannot qualify for the AFC Champions League as they are not recognised as an AFC club.) | 27 | 5 | 6 | 16 | 31 | 55 | −24 | 21 | |
| 10 | Central Coast Mariners | 27 | 4 | 8 | 15 | 28 | 49 | −21 | 20 | |

Source: A-Leagues
Rules for classification: 1) points; 2) goal difference; 3) number of goals scored.
(C) Champions

==== Results summary ====
| Overall | | | | | | | | Home | | | | | | Away | | | | | |
| Pld | W | D | L | GF | GA | GD | Pts | W | D | L | GF | GA | GD | W | D | L | GF | GA | GD |
|---|---|---|---|---|---|---|---|---|---|---|---|---|---|---|---|---|---|---|---|
| 27 | 10 | 5 | 12 | 33 | 40 | −7 | 35 | 4 | 2 | 8 | 13 | 19 | −6 | 6 | 3 | 4 | 20 | 21 | −1 |

Last updated: 14 April 2018.
Source: ultimatealeague.com

==== Results by round ====
| Round | 1 | 2 | 3 | 4 | 5 | 6 | 7 | 8 | 9 | 10 | 11 | 12 | 13 | 14 | 15 | 16 | 17 | 18 | 19 | 20 | 21 | 22 | 23 | 24 | 25 | 26 | 27 |
|---|---|---|---|---|---|---|---|---|---|---|---|---|---|---|---|---|---|---|---|---|---|---|---|---|---|---|---|
| Ground | A | H | H | A | H | A | H | A | A | H | H | H | A | H | H | A | H | A | H | A | H | H | A | A | H | A | A |
| Result | L | L | L | D | D | D | W | L | W | D | L | L | W | L | L | L | W | W | L | W | L | W | W | D | W | L | W |
| Position | 9 | 10 | 10 | 10 | 9 | 10 | 8 | 9 | 8 | 6 | 9 | 9 | 8 | 9 | 9 | 9 | 8 | 7 | 7 | 7 | 7 | 8 | 7 | 7 | 6 | 7 | 6 |

Updated to match(es) played on 15 April 2018. Source: ultimatealeague.com
A = Away; H = Home; W = Win; D = Draw; L = Loss

==== Matches ====
Win Draw Loss

| 6 October 2017 1 | Melbourne City | 2–0 | Brisbane Roar | Melbourne |
| 19:50 AEDT | Kamau 45', 74' | Report | | Stadium: AAMI Park; Attendance: 9,589; Referee: Jarred Gillett |

| 13 October 2017 2 | Brisbane Roar | 1–2 | Adelaide United | Brisbane |
| 18:50 AEST | Maccarone 8' | Report | Gūlūm (yellow card) 14'; Kitto 88'; Absalonsen 90+2' | Stadium: Suncorp Stadium; Attendance: 11,178; Referee: Adam Kersey |

| 22 October 2017 3 | Brisbane Roar | 1–2 | Newcastle Jets | Brisbane |
| 16:00 AEST | Boogaard 42' (o.g.) | Report | O'Donovan 12'; D. Petratos 44' | Stadium: Suncorp Stadium; Attendance: 10,104; Referee: Matthew Conger |

| 28 October 2017 4 | Wellington Phoenix | 3–3 | Brisbane Roar | Wellington |
| 19:35 NZDT | Kaluđerović 1', 20'; Krishna 18' | Report | Maccarone 45', 82' (pen.); Papadopoulos 66' | Stadium: Westpac Stadium; Attendance: 7,018; Referee: Jarred Gillett |

| 5 November 2017 5 | Brisbane Roar | 0–0 | Central Coast Mariners | Brisbane |
| 16:00 AEST | | Report | | Stadium: Suncorp Stadium; Attendance: 11,485; Referee: Daniel Elder |

| 11 November 2017 6 | Melbourne Victory | 1–1 | Brisbane Roar | Melbourne |
| 19:50 AEDT | Berisha 79' | Report | Holman 84' | Stadium: Etihad Stadium; Attendance: 18,098; Referee: Kris Griffiths-Jones |

| 17 November 2017 7 | Brisbane Roar | 3–1 | Melbourne City | Brisbane |
| 18:50 AEST | Papadopoulos 5', 70'; Bauthéac 43' | Report | Mauk 54' | Stadium: Suncorp Stadium; Attendance: 9,285; Referee: Chris Beath |

| 25 November 2017 8 | Sydney FC | 3–1 | Brisbane Roar | Sydney |
| 19:50 AEDT | Carney 8'; Mierzejewski 15' (pen.); Ryall 79' | Report | Hingert 90+3' | Stadium: Allianz Stadium; Attendance: 10,044; Referee: Alex King |

| 2 December 2017 9 | Western Sydney Wanderers | 0–2 | Brisbane Roar | Sydney |
| 17:35 AEDT | | Report | Maccarone 45'; Franjic 66' | Stadium: ANZ Stadium; Attendance: 8,215; Referee: Adam Fielding |

| 9 December 2017 10 | Brisbane Roar | 0–0 | Wellington Phoenix | Gold Coast |
| 16:35 AEST | | Report | | Stadium: Cbus Super Stadium; Attendance: 5,192; Referee: Shaun Evans |

| 17 December 2017 11 | Brisbane Roar | 1–2 | Melbourne Victory | Brisbane |
| 18:00 AEST | Maccarone 56' | Report | Williams 12'; Barbarouses 19' | Stadium: Suncorp Stadium; Attendance: 10,225; Referee: Peter Green |

| 21 December 2017 12 | Brisbane Roar | 1–2 | Perth Glory | Brisbane |
| 18:50 AEST | Maccarone 38' | Report | Keogh 80'; Castro 82' | Stadium: Suncorp Stadium; Attendance: 7,031; Referee: Kurt Ams |

| 30 December 2017 13 | Adelaide United | 1–2 | Brisbane Roar | Adelaide |
| 17:05 ACDT | Blackwood 69' | Report | Khalfallah 33'; Maccarone 45' | Stadium: Coopers Stadium; Attendance: 9,875; Referee: Adam Fielding |

| 5 January 2018 14 | Brisbane Roar | 0–2 | Western Sydney Wanderers | Brisbane |
| 18:50 AEST | | Report | Riera 29'; Bridge 45' | Stadium: Suncorp Stadium; Attendance: 11,189; Referee: Shaun Evans |

| 8 January 2018 15 | Brisbane Roar | 0–3 | Sydney FC | Brisbane |
| 18:50 AEST | | Report | Bobô 18'; Mierzejewski 50'; Carney 86' | Stadium: Suncorp Stadium; Attendance: 7,826; Referee: Kris Griffiths-Jones |

| 12 January 2018 16 | Newcastle Jets | 1–0 | Brisbane Roar | Newcastle |
| 19:50 AEDT | Hoffman 11' | Report | | Stadium: McDonald Jones Stadium; Attendance: 12,137; Referee: Jonathan Borreiro |

| 18 January 2018 17 | Brisbane Roar | 3–2 | Perth Glory | Brisbane |
| 18:50 AEST | Papadopoulos 4'; Franjic 60'; Holman 73' | Report | Harold 11', 68' | Stadium: Suncorp Stadium; Attendance: 6,258; Referee: Kris Griffiths-Jones |

| 27 January 2018 18 | Central Coast Mariners | 1–2 | Brisbane Roar | Gosford |
| 19:50 AEDT | Powell 63' | Report | Holman 23'; McKay 54' | Stadium: Central Coast Stadium; Attendance: 5,264; Referee: Adam Kersey |

| 4 February 2018 19 | Brisbane Roar | 1–2 | Melbourne City | Brisbane |
| 18:00 AEST | Maccarone 14' | Report | Budziński 19'; Mauk 66' | Stadium: Suncorp Stadium; Attendance: 9,150; Referee: Jonathan Barreiro |

| 9 February 2018 20 | Melbourne Victory | 1–2 | Brisbane Roar | Melbourne |
| 19:50 AEDT | Troisi 83' | Report | Maccarone 7'; Holman 28' | Stadium: AAMI Park; Attendance: 14,576; Referee: Chris Beath |

| 24 February 2018 21 | Brisbane Roar | 0–1 | Newcastle Jets | Brisbane |
| 16:35 AEST | | Report | Champness 79' | Stadium: Suncorp Stadium; Attendance: 8,120; Referee: Stephen Lucas |

| 3 March 2018 22 | Brisbane Roar | 1–0 | Adelaide United | Brisbane |
| 18:50 AEST | Bauthéac 41' | Report | | Stadium: Suncorp Stadium; Attendance: 8,237; Referee: Peter Green |

| 17 March 2018 23 | Sydney FC | 1–2 | Brisbane Roar | Sydney |
| AEDT | Ninković 59' | Report | McKay 9'; Pepper 18' | Stadium: Allianz Stadium; Attendance: 10,890; Referee: Kurt Ams |

| 25 March 2018 24 | Wellington Phoenix | 2–2 | Brisbane Roar | Wellington |
| 17:00 NZDT | Kaluđerović 53'; Rogerson 64' | Report | Holman 50'; Kristensen 68' | Stadium: Westpac Stadium; Attendance: 4,594; Referee: Daniel Elder |

| 31 March 2018 25 | Brisbane Roar | 1–0 | Central Coast Mariners | Brisbane |
| 16:35 AEST | Henrique 13' | Report | | Stadium: Suncorp Stadium; Attendance: 12,019; Referee: Jonathan Barreiro |

| 7 April 2018 26 | Western Sydney Wanderers | 3–0 | Brisbane Roar | Sydney |
| 17:35 AEDT | Riera 4', 16'; Ikonomidis 40' | Report | | Stadium: ANZ Stadium; Attendance: 9,266; Referee: Kurt Ams |

| 14 April 2018 27 | Perth Glory | 2–3 | Brisbane Roar | Perth |
| 22:00 AWST | Taggart 24'; Pepper 86' (o.g.) | Report | Henrique 30', 52'; Kristensen 40' | Stadium: nib Stadium; Attendance: 9,579; Referee: Peter Green |

==== Finals series ====
| 20 April 2018 Elimination-final | Melbourne City | 2–0 | Brisbane Roar | Melbourne |
| 19:50 AEST | Mauk 59'; Fitzgerald 90+1' | Report | | Stadium: AAMI Park; Attendance: 7,757; Referee: Jarred Gillett |

=== FFA Cup ===
| 9 August 2017 Round of 32 | Brisbane Roar (Queensland) | 1–5 | (Victoria (state)) Melbourne Victory | Brisbane |
| 19:30 AEST | Skapetis 90' | Report | Austin 26'; Troisi 35'; Berisha 48' (pen.), 74'; Milligan 51' (pen.) | Stadium: Perry Park; Attendance: 3,184; Referee: Chris Beath |

=== AFC Champions League ===
==== Qualifying play-offs ====
| 23 January 2018 Preliminary round 2 | Brisbane Roar (Australia) | 2–3 | (Philippines) Ceres–Negros | Brisbane, Australia |
| 19:00 AEST | Maccarone 35'; Bauthéac 86' | Report | Bienve 43', 65'; Nazari 75' | Stadium: Queensland Sport and Athletics Centre; Attendance: 1,279; Referee: Yudai Yamamoto (Japan) |

== See also ==
- 2017–18 Brisbane Roar FC (women) season
