= Aaron Reardon =

Aaron Reardon may refer to:

- Aaron Reardon (politician)
- Aaron Reardon (soccer)
