= Bryony Duus =

Australian soccer player and coach

Personal information
- Date of birth: 7 October 1977 (age 49)
- Place of birth: Australia
- Position: Midfielder

Youth career
- Coalstars

Senior career*
Years	Team	Apps	(Gls)
1996	Queensland Academy of Sport		
2000–2004	Queensland Sting		

International career
1996–2004	Australia	47	(2)
- * Club domestic league appearances and goals

Bryony Duus (born 7 October 1977) is an Australian soccer coach and former midfielder for the Australia women's national soccer team.

== Life ==
Duus grew up in Ipswich, Queensland where she played football for Coalstars and Ipswich Girls Grammar School.

Duus was part of the Queensland Academy of Sport and Australian Institute of Sport women's football programs, before going on to play in the national championships for the Queensland Sting.

She competed at the 2000 Summer Olympics and 2003 FIFA Women's World Cup.

She is the current U17 coach and Senior Women assistant coach at Western Pride FC, having been invited to the club by her former international teammate Belinda Kitching.

Having learned Italian, Duus joined the AIS European Training Centre in a logistics role after a persistent knee injury prevented her from continuing her playing career.

== See also ==
- Australia at the 2000 Summer Olympics
