= Briggs Road Sporting Complex =

Association football stadium in Ipswich, Queensland Australia

Briggs Rd Sporting Complex
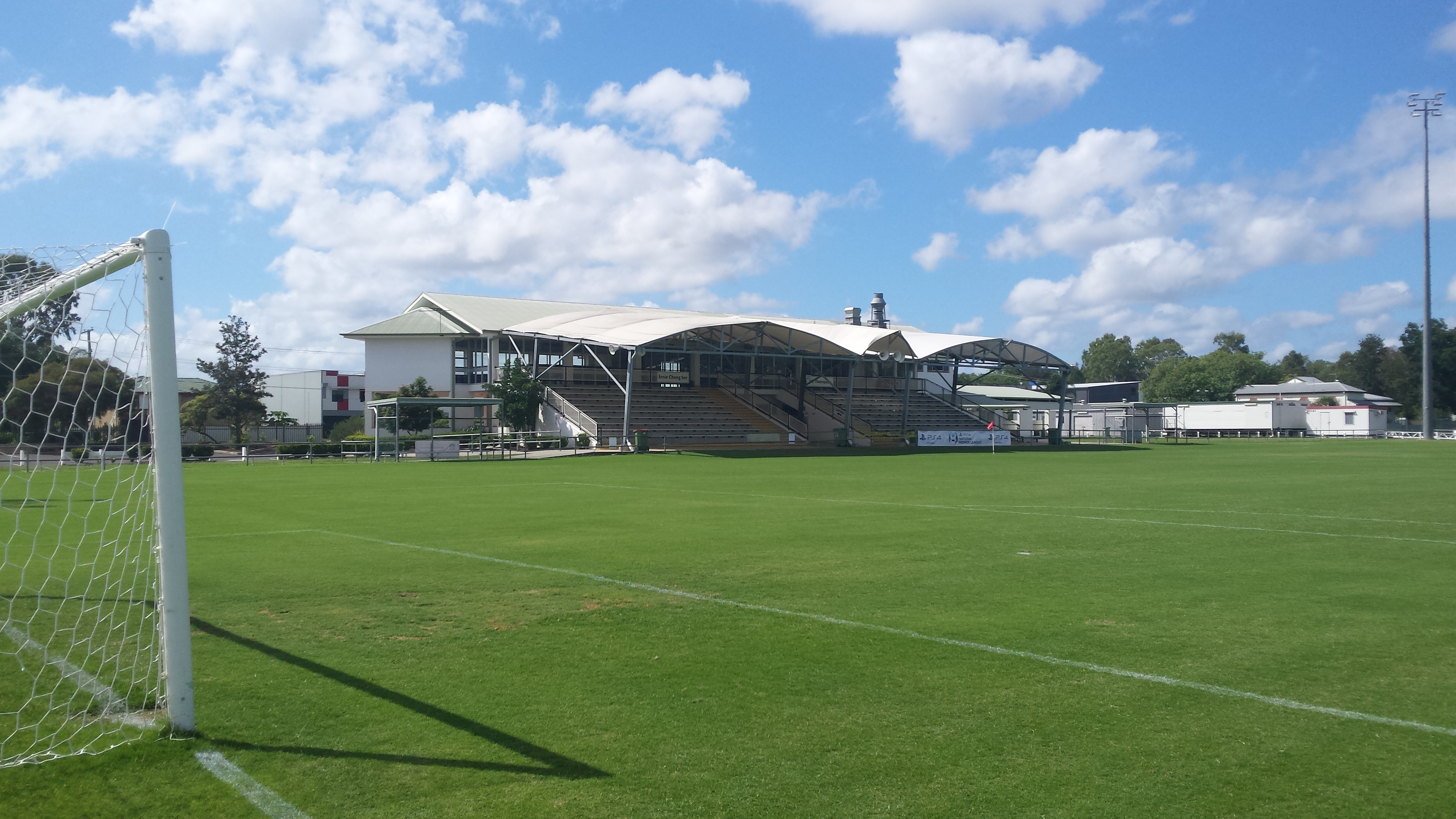
- Interactive map of Briggs Rd Sporting Complex
- Location: Ipswich, Queensland
- Coordinates: 27°38′24″S 152°45′41″E
- Owner: City of Ipswich
- Capacity: 3,500
- Surface: Grass

Tenant
- Ipswich FC

Briggs Road Sporting Complex is an Association football stadium located in the Ipswich, Queensland suburb of Flinders View.

The ground is home to Ipswich FC, which plays in the Australian third-tier Queensland Premier League competition.

The facility contains three rectangular fields and a training area.

Briggs Road Sporting Complex forms a larger sporting precinct with the neighbouring Ipswich Hockey Complex, which together have been used for sporting carnivals and regional trials.

== History ==
Briggs Road Sporting Complex was the home of Ipswich Junior Rugby league and briefly state league side Ipswich Jets. It hosted the 2012 Murri Rugby League Carnival.

On Wednesday May 18, 2016, a crowd of reported variously as between 1200 and 3200 watched Western Pride FC played New Zealand national football team with the visitors winning 2–0.

On Saturday 1 September 2017, a crowd of 3383 watched Western Pride FC win the National Premier Leagues Queensland Grand Final against Moreton Bay United FC.

== Neville T. Bonner Building ==
The grandstand and clubhouse is named after Ipswich resident Senator Neville Bonner, the first of the country's indigenous Australians to become a member of the Australian Parliament.

The clubhouse features a function room, canteen and bar.
