= Alistair Wallis =

Australian soccer player

Alastair Wallis
Personal information
- Date of birth: 21 July 1989 (age 37)
- Position: Defender

Youth career
- Highway United FC

Senior career*
Years	Team	Apps	(Gls)
2009–2012	AmaZulu F.C.	41	(0)
2012	Thanda Royal Zulu F.C.	18	(0)
2013	Ipswich Knights FC	19	(0)
2015–2016	Western Pride FC	20	(0)
2017	Ipswich Knights	17	(1)
2017	Souths United FC	2	(0)
- Ripley Valley FC
- * Club domestic league appearances and goals

Alastair Wallis (born 21 July 1989) is a South African former professional soccer player who played as a right-back, most recently for Souths United FC in the Queensland Premier League. He previously played for AmaZulu F.C. in the South African Premier Division and Thanda Royal Zulu F.C. in the National First Division.

== Playing career ==
=== Club ===
Wallis signed for AmaZulu FC in 2009. During his time at AmaZulu, Wallis attended the 2011 TUNZA African Children's Conference on the Environment.

In 2012, Wallis was loaned to Thanda Royal Zulu in the National First Division for the season.

==== Ipswich Knights ====
Wallis joined Ipswich Knights FC after emigrating to Australia. Wallis showed good form for Knights, before his progress was affected by injuries.

==== Western Pride ====
Wallis joined Western Pride FC late in the 2015 National Premier Leagues Queensland, where he acted as a mentor for a squad largely made up of teenagers.

==== Later career ====
Wallis returned to Ipswich Knights for the 2017 season, where he scored his first senior goal after converting a penalty.

In 2018, he played for Souths United in the newly formed Queensland Premier League, but only made two appearances.
