= Cameron Crestani =

Australian professional footballer

Personal information
- Date of birth: 18 April 1996 (age 30)
- Place of birth: Stanthorpe, Queensland, Australia
- Position: Central defender

Team information
- Current team: Strømmen
- Number: 3

Youth career
- 2014–2016: Brisbane Roar

Senior career*
Years	Team	Apps	(Gls)
2013	QAS	19	(0)
2014–2016	Brisbane Roar NPL	50	(1)
2017	Brisbane Roar	3	(0)
2017–2019	Western Pride	57	(8)
2020	Peninsula Power	23	(0)
2021–2022	Caboolture Sports	20	(6)
2022–	Strømmen	106	(8)
- * Club domestic league appearances and goals as of 14 November 2026

Cameron Crestani (born 18 April 1996) is an Australian soccer player who plays as a central defender for Strømmen IF. He previously played for Peninsula Power FC in the QLD NPL competition where he was named as NPL player of the year.

== Club career ==
In May 2017, Brisbane Roar announced that they would not be signing Crestani on a senior contract for the 2017/18 season. He soon signed on as a marquee player for Western Pride in the National Premier League's Queensland competition.

In September 2017, Crestani scored Pride's first goal in a 2–1 win over Moreton Bay United FC to win the National Premier Leagues Queensland Grand Final, the club's first piece of major silverware.

A few days later it was announced Crestani had re-signed for Pride for the 2018 season.

In 2018 Crestani scored 3 goals in 24 appearances as Pride finished third. He was named stand-in captain for the middle section of the season after an injury to Jesse Rigby.

In 2022 Crestani moved to Norway to play third-tier soccer for Strømmen IF, a club managed by Australian Kasey Wehrman.

== Personal life ==
Cameron is originally from Stanthorpe, Queensland, where he grew up on his parents' farm with four brothers. He graduated from Stanthorpe State High School in 2013 and currently studies a Bachelor of Secondary Education at Griffith University.

Crestani's other passion is cricket, having previously won 3 premierships in a row with Souths Cricket Club in the Stanthorpe District Cricket Competition. In 2016-17 he signed for Valley's Cricket Club and scored a club season-high 67 runs vs Tenterfield, including a towering six over mid-off off the bowling of former Southern Stars opening bowler, Amanda Carpenter.
