= Ipswich City Bulls =

- Nickname: "The Bulls"
- Short name: Ipswich City Bulls
- Founded: 16 February 1975
- Dissolved: 2023 (Merged with Western Pride)
- Ground: Sutton Park
- Manager: Norbert Duga
- League: Capital League 1 & Reserves

Ipswich City Bulls Football Club, also known as The Bulls, was a grassroots football club in Ipswich, Queensland, Australia. Founded in 1975, the club merged with Western Pride FC in 2023 to form Ipswich FC. The men's team finished competition in Football Brisbane – Capital League. In addition to league competition, the club offered youth development pathways. "The Bulls" local rivals were Ipswich Knights and Western Spirit.

== History ==
The club formed in early 1975 with five teams and 70 players, drawn from all parts of Ipswich City, although most of them come from Leichhardt and the Brassall area.

The intention was to provide an avenue for people living in the north western side of Ipswich to compete in football. The Club headquartered at Sutton Park, entered the Brisbane Junior Football Association competition for the first time in 1975. The first three years saw an increase in player numbers to two ladies teams, 15 junior and one colts (senior division) team and about 200 players.

A former star player, Henry Lines ("The Angry Hungarian") became the club's first team coach.

In 2012, the Ipswich City Bulls received a $3,000 grant to replace equipment lost in the Queensland floods from Hyundai Motor Company Australia.

In 2023 it was announced that Ipswich City and Western Pride would merge ahead of the 2024 season, with the new club being called Ipswich FC.

== Notable players ==
- Allira Toby played for the Ipswich City Bulls junior team.
