= Ipswich FC =

- Full name: Ipswich City FC
- Founded: 2023 (as a Merger between Western Pride FC and Ipswich City FC
- Ground: Briggs Rd Sporting Complex
- Capacity: ~3,500
- Manager: Jeff Dent (Men) and Adam Clay (Women)
- League: Men: FQPL1 Women: FQPL4
- 2026: Men: 4th Women: 1st
- Website: ipswichfc.com.au//

Ipswich City FC is a soccer club based in Ipswich, Queensland, Australia. The club was formed as a merger between Western Pride FC and Ipswich City FC. The nature of the merger saw only the Senior Women sides truly merge from a footballing perspective, as the Senior Men's, youth and junior sides of both clubs continued to compete in their existing competitions under the new name.

Western Pride were best known for winning the NPL Queensland Men's Grand Final in 2017. The Men's team were relegated to the Football Queensland Premier League in 2020, and where they continued until the merger.

Ipswich City FC were formed in early 1975. Their Men's team were playing in the Football Queensland Premier League 4 Metro at the time of the merger. Their Senior Women's side had higher level success, most recently winning the Brisbane Women's Premier League in 2019.

In October of 2026, the club posted on their Facebook and Instagram pages to announce they would rebrand to 'Ipswich City FC' from the 2027 season onwards. Despite the Ipswich City Bulls originally operated under the name, Ipswich City will not take the 'Bulls' mascot, rathering opting for their history as 'Limestone Mining Town'

The Men's sides of each former club continued in their respective divisions. The FQPL4 Men's side retained the name Ipswich City Bulls until the end of the season 2025 season before folding, a plan which allowed that side of the merger to celebrate their 50th anniversary.

The combined Women side were moved to the Football Queensland Premier League Metro 3 Women competition, but were relegated to the newly created Football Queensland Premier League Women 4 ahead of the 2026 season via a league restructure. They were promoted back to FQPLW3 undefeated at the end of the 2026 season.

== Senior Men managers ==
Period	Name
2024	Garrett McDuling
2024 - 2025	Andrew Catton
2026	James Baty
2027-	Jeff Dent

== Senior Women managers ==
2024-2025	Matthew Maitland
2026	Adam Clay

== Senior Men squad ==
Note: Flags indicate national team as defined under FIFA eligibility rules; some limited exceptions apply. Players may hold more than one non-FIFA nationality.

No.	Pos.	Nation	Player
—	GK	AUS	Patrick Millard
—	GK	AUS	JJake Brice
—	DF	AUS	Ben Piper
—	DF	AUS	Nick Piper
—	DF	AUS	James Cuminao
—	DF	AUS	Daniel Kovacevic
—	DF	AUS	Junsai Esaka
—	DF	AUS	Ezekiel Lavender
—	MF	AUS	Cooper Nicols
—	MF	AUS	Deng Deng

No.	Pos.	Nation	Player
—	MF	AUS	Matt Haspels
—	MF	AUS	Ryan Stieler
—	MF	AUS	Caleb Butler
—	MF	AUS	Nikolas Veal
—	MF	FRA	Zack Damianakis
—	MF	AUS	Luke Damianakis
—	FW	AUS	Jordan Ozzi
—	FW	ENG	Wilfred Phillip

|} |}

== Honours ==
2026: Football Queensland Premier League 4 Metro Women - Premiers

== Competition history (Senior Men) ==
Season	League											FFA Cup
Season	Division (tier)	Pld	W	D	L	GF	GA	GD	Pts	Position	Finals	FFA Cup
2024	Football Queensland Premier League (3)	22	5	5	12	19	47	−28	20	10th	DNQ	Preliminary Round 4
2025	Football Queensland Premier League (3)	22	5	8	9	24	26	−2	23	9th	DNQ	Preliminary Round 4
2026	Football Queensland Premier League (3)	22	10	5	7	35	40	5	35	4th	Qualified	Preliminary Round 5

Key:	Premiers / Champions	Promoted ↑	Relegated ↓

The tier is the level in the Australian soccer league system

== Competition history (Senior Women) ==
Season	League										
Season	Division (tier)	Pld	W	D	L	GF	GA	GD	Pts	Position	Queensland Finals
2024	Football Queensland Premier League Metro 3 Women (5)	20	10	1	9	35	31	-6	31	5th	DNQ
2025	Football Queensland Premier League Metro 3 Women (5)	24	7	5	12	36	33	3	26	10th	DNQ
2026	NPL Queensland]] (2)	21	19	2	0	119	15	104	59	1st	Qualified

Key:	Premiers / Champions	Promoted ↑	Relegated ↓

The tier is the level in the Australian soccer league system
