= Brendan White =

Australian soccer player (born 1992)

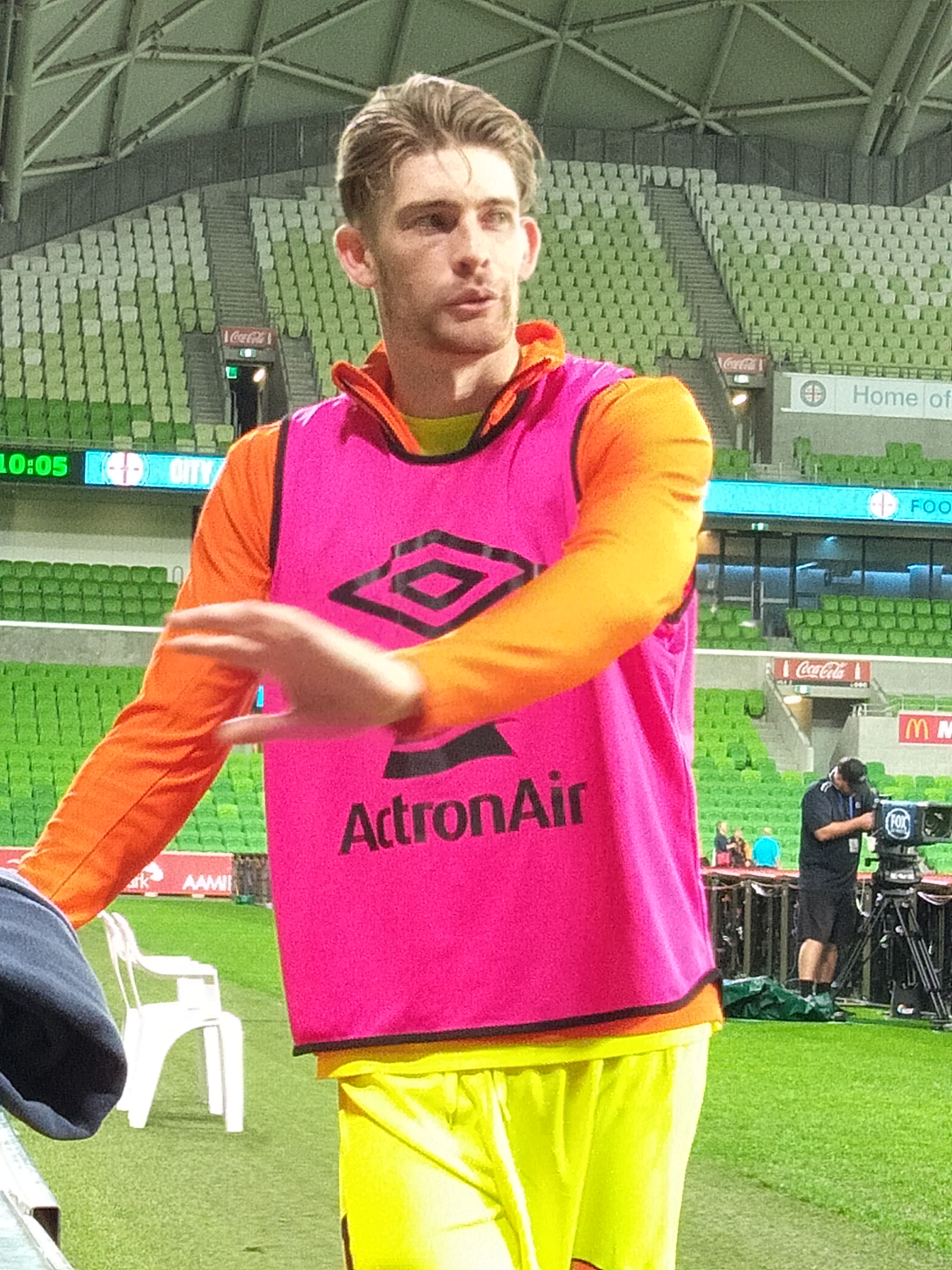
- Brendan White with Brisbane Roar

Personal information
- Full name: Brendan White
- Date of birth: 16 April 1992 (age 34)
- Place of birth: Brisbane, Australia
- Height: 6 ft 2 in (1.88 m)
- Position: Goalkeeper

Team information
- Current team: Bentleigh Greens

Youth career
- 2011–2012: Gold Coast United

Senior career*
Years	Team	Apps	(Gls)
2011	Brisbane Strikers		
2012	Gold Coast United	0	(0)
2013–2014	Logan Lightning	44	(0)
2015–2016	Redlands United	36	(0)
2017	Port Melbourne	26	(0)
2017–2019	Brisbane Roar	4	(0)
2019	Heidelberg United	14	(0)
2019–2020	Melbourne Victory	0	(0)
2020	Brisbane Strikers	24	(0)
2021	Peninsula Power	14	(0)
2022	Heidelberg United	17	(0)
2023–2024	Oakleigh Cannons	3	(0)
2024–	Bentleigh Greens	9	(0)
- * Club domestic league appearances and goals as of 24 July 2022

Brendan White (born 16 April 1992), is an Australian professional soccer player who plays as a goalkeeper for Bentleigh Greens.

== Club career ==
=== Brisbane Roar ===
Brendan White signed on with Brisbane Roar as a mature-age rookie at the age of 25.

He made his Brisbane debut against Adelaide United as a substitute for Dylan Wenzel-Halls within a red card for Jamie Young. The result was a 4–3 loss.

=== Heidelberg United ===
White joined Heidelberg United in 2019.

=== Melbourne Victory ===
In October 2019, White signed with Melbourne Victory as an injury replacement for Matt Acton. In February 2020, he was released by Melbourne Victory.

=== Brisbane Strikers ===
White returned to Queensland in February, 2020, signing for National Premier Leagues club Brisbane Strikers.

=== Heidelberg United ===
White returned to Victoria in 2022, signing for National Premier Leagues Victoria club at Heidelberg United.

=== Oakleigh Cannons ===
White departed to Oakleigh where he would make 3 appearances

=== Bentleigh Greens ===
After a solitary year with the cannons he departed to Bentleigh Greens where he would make 9 appearances over their 2025 Victorian Premier League 1 season and 2026 NPL Victoria season. His season back in the NPL was marred by a first minute keeper mistake that led to a Jordan Swibel goal against South Melbourne; he would go on to concede 5 to South in the return leg before being dropped for the rest of the campaign.

== Career statistics ==
Club	Season	Division	League		Cup		Continental		Total	
Club	Season	Division	Apps	Goals	Apps	Goals	Apps	Goals	Apps	Goals
Gold Coast United	2011–12	A-League	0	0	—		—		0	0
Brisbane Roar	2017–18	A-League	0	0	—		0	0	0	0
Brisbane Roar	2018–19	A-League	4	0	0	0	—		4	0
Melbourne Victory	2019–20	A-League	0	0	—		0	0	0	0
