= Peter Skapetis =

Australian soccer player

Personal information
- Full name: Petros Skapetis
- Date of birth: 13 January 1995 (age 31)
- Place of birth: Melbourne, Australia
- Height: 1.76 m (5 ft 9 in)
- Position: Striker

Youth career
- –2008: South Melbourne
- 2009–2010: FFV NTC
- 2011–2012: Birmingham City

Senior career*
Years	Team	Apps	(Gls)
2012–2014	Queens Park Rangers	0	(0)
2014–2016	Stoke City	0	(0)
2017	Dover Athletic	0	(0)
2017–2018	Brisbane Roar	14	(0)
2018	Central Coast Mariners	5	(1)
2018–2019	Dandenong Thunder	12	(2)
2019–2020	South Melbourne	12	(1)
2021	Kingston City	14	(6)
2022	Altona Magic	22	(0)

International career^{‡}
2014	Australia U-20	7	(6)
2014	Australia U-23	3	(2)
- * Club domestic league appearances and goals as of 17 November 2022 ‡ National team caps and goals as of 9 August 2017

Petros "Peter" Skapetis (born 13 January 1995) is an Australian semi-professional footballer who last played as striker for National Premier Leagues Victoria side Altona Magic SC.

Peter attended Rowville Secondary College, as part of the Rowville Sports Academy Football Program.

== Playing career ==
=== Club ===
In April 2014, Skapetis joined Premier League side Stoke City, initially to play for their under-21 side.

Skapetis had trials at several clubs, including Derby County, Cardiff City and Sheffield United late in 2016. He signed with Dover Athletic in March 2017.

Skapetis returned to Australia in 2017, where he underwent a trial with Brisbane Roar. He made his competitive debut for the Roar in their 2017 FFA Cup match against Melbourne Victory. Despite the Roar losing the game 5–1, Skapetis came on as a substitute and scored with a long-range effort late in the game.

On 18 January 2018, Skapetis left Brisbane Roar and joined fellow A-League club Central Coast Mariners on a one-year deal.

On 24 September 2018, National Premier Leagues Victoria side Dandenong Thunder SC announced the signing of Skapetis until the end of the 2020 NPL Victoria season.

== Honours ==
=== Club ===
Dover Athletic

- Kent Senior Cup: 2016–17
