= Belinda Kitching =

Australian soccer player and coach

Personal information
- Date of birth: 15 July 1977 (age 49)
- Position: Goalkeeper

Youth career
- Coalstars (now part of Ipswich Knights FC)

Senior career*
Years	Team	Apps	(Gls)
1996 –	Coalstars		
1996 –	Queensland Academy of Sport		
2001–2006	Tweed Heads		
2006–2016	United Warriors, Hervey Bay		

International career^{‡}
1996–1999	Australia	32	

Managerial career
- 2002–2006: Tweed Heads
- 2006–2016: United Warriors, Hervey Bay
- 2016 – 2019: Western Pride FC
- * Club domestic league appearances and goals ‡ National team caps and goals as of 19 June 1999 (before the 1999 FIFA Women's World Cup)

Belinda Kitching (born 15 July 1977) is an Australian football coach and former goalkeeper for the Australia women's national soccer team.

== Playing career ==
Kitching played junior football for Coalstars in Ipswich, before progressing to the senior team where she won the Football Brisbane Women's Premier League Player of the Season in 1996. The same year, she was selected for the Queensland Academy of Sport women's football program, where she played in the fledgling national women's competition.

In 1996, Kitching was selected for the Australia women's national soccer team. She was part of the team at the 1998 OFC Women's Championship and started two group games at the 1999 FIFA Women's World Cup.

Kitching played 36 times for the Matildas and recorded 9 clean sheets.

== Coaching career ==
Kitching played for Tweed Heads Women from 2001, before taking over the coaching role a year later. After five years, she moved north to Hervey Bay to become player coach at United Warriors, a post she held until 2016.

In October 2016, Kitching returned to her home town of Ipswich to become senior women's coach of Western Pride FC, having gained her Football Federation Australia B license the previous year.

== Personal life ==
Kitching is the granddaughter of Socceroo George "Fat" Kitching, while her father George Jnr was also a goalkeeper who represented Queensland.
