= Kasey Wehrman =

Australian soccer player

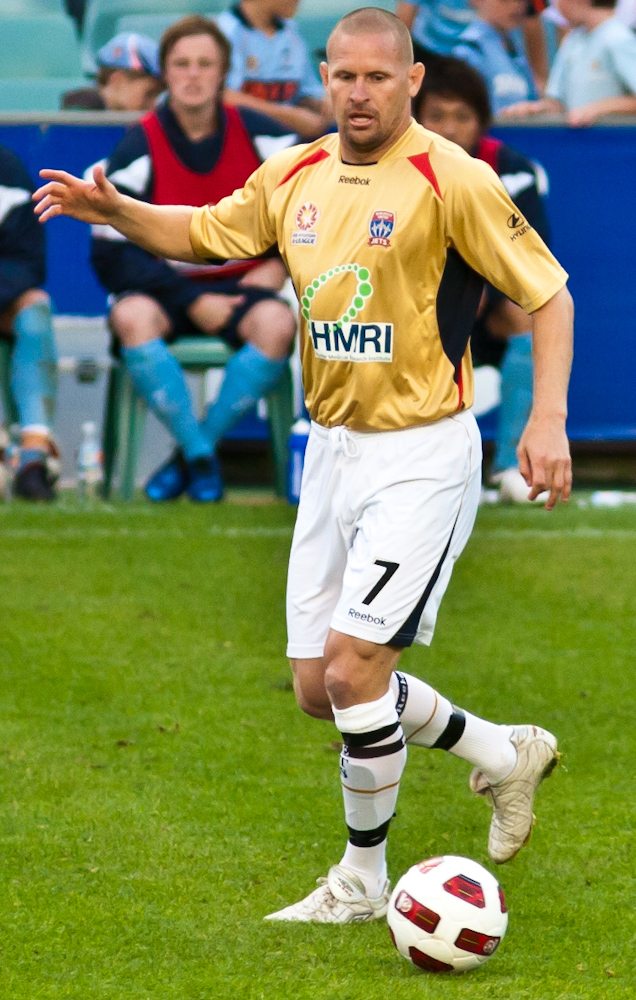
- Wehrman with Newcastle Jets in 2010

Personal information
- Full name: Kasey Desmond Wehrman
- Date of birth: 16 August 1977 (age 49)
- Place of birth: Cloncurry, Australia
- Height: 1.80 m (5 ft 11 in)
- Position: Defensive midfielder

Youth career
- Acacia Ridge
- Mount Isa
- 1995: QAS

Senior career*
| Years | Team | Apps | (Gls) |
| 1995–1999 | Brisbane Strikers | 49 | (6) |
| 1999–2001 | Perth Glory | 47 | (1) |
| 2001–2003 | Moss | 37 | (4) |
| 2003–2007 | Lillestrøm | 81 | (2) |
| 2007–2009 | Fredrikstad | 46 | (4) |
| 2009 | → Lyn (loan) | 5 | (0) |
| 2010–2012 | Newcastle Jets | 37 | (0) |
| 2013 | Western Pride FC | 4 | (0) |

International career
| 1997 | Australia U-20 | 6 | (3) |
| 1998–2000 | Australia U-23 | 20 | (2) |
| 1998–2006 | Australia | 12 | (0) |

Managerial career
- 2012–2014: Western Pride
- 2015: Strømmen (assistant)
- 2016: Ørn Horten
- 2018: Strømmen IF (assistant)
- 2019: Fredrikstad (assistant)
- 2022–2023: Strømmen IF
- 2024–2025: Ull/Kisa
- 2026: Raufoss
Medal record
Representing Australia
Men's Association football
OFC Nations Cup
| Runner-up | 1998 Australia |
AFC–OFC Challenge Cup
| Runner-up | 2001 Japan |
OFC U-20 Championship
| Winner | 1997 Tahiti |
- * Club domestic league appearances and goals

Kasey Wehrman (born 16 August 1977) is an Australian footballer who is currently.

== Club career ==
Born in Cloncurry, having impressed as a youth player with the Queensland Academy of Sport, Wehrman signed with National Soccer League club Brisbane Strikers, and was an integral member of their premiership team in 1996–97, where he was crowned the Under 21 Player of the Year. After four seasons with the Strikers, he transferred to Perth Glory in 1999, where he helped the club win the Minor Premiership in his first season.

With two seasons in Perth, Wehrman sought a move overseas, and after successful trials in Norway, he signed with Moss. He settled into first team football almost immediately, becoming a mainstay in the Moss midfield. After the club was relegated in 2002, Wehrman signed with Lillestrøm where he featured for the next four seasons, before transferring to Fredrikstad in 2007.

On 31 August he signed a loan deal with Lyn for the 2009 season. On 19 October 2009 reports suggested that Kasey was to move to Preston North End as a free agent. On 8 April 2010, it was announced that Wehrman had signed a two-year deal with the Newcastle Jets, returning to Australia after eight years abroad. After speaking out publicly against the Jet's coach Gary van Egmond, Wehrman's was taken out of the squad, and never took to the field for the Jets again.

== International career ==
Wehrman was capped 11 times for the Australian under-20 team and has played a number of times for the full Australian national team including unofficial and official international games making his debut in 1998 against Fiji in Brisbane. He was a surprise inclusion for a friendly match against Ghana in November 2006 after having been overlooked for the previous 5 years.

== National team statistics ==
Australia national team
| Year | Apps | Goals |
|---|---|---|
| 1998 | 4 | 0 |
| 1999 | 0 | 0 |
| 2000 | 5 | 0 |
| 2001 | 2 | 0 |
| 2002 | 0 | 0 |
| 2003 | 0 | 0 |
| 2004 | 0 | 0 |
| 2005 | 0 | 0 |
| 2006 | 1 | 0 |
| Total | 12 | 0 |

== Coaching career ==
On 25 October 2012 it was announced he had accepted the head coach position at the newly formed Western Pride football club who will participate in the Australian Premier League Queensland Conference. He resigned in July 2014 to return home to Norway after two seasons at Ipswich.

On 15 December 2021, Wehrman was named head coach of Norwegian side Strømmen IF. He was hired by Ull/Kisa ahead of the 2024 season.

== Honours ==
=== Player ===
Brisbane Strikers

- NSL Championship: 1996-1997

Australia

- OFC Nations Cup: runner-up 1998
- AFC–OFC Challenge Cup: runner-up 2001

Australia U-20

- OFC U-19 Men's Championship: 1997

=== Individual ===
- NSL Under-21 Player of the Year: 1996-1997
- PFA A-League Team of the Season: 2010–11
