= Western Pride FC =

- Full name: Western Pride Football Club
- Nickname: Pride
- Founded: 2012
- Dissolved: 2023 (Merged with Ipswich City FC)
- Ground: Briggs Rd Sporting Complex
- Capacity: ~3,500
- Owner: Football Ipswich Inc.
- Manager: Vacant (Men) and Russell Yarrow (Women)
- League: FQPL
- 2023: 5th of 12
- Website: westernpridefc.com.au

Western Pride Football Club was a soccer club based in Ipswich, Queensland, Australia. The club is best known for winning the NPL Queensland Grand Final in 2017. Pride's Senior Men currently play in the Football Queensland Premier League, following relegation in 2018, while the juniors and Senior Women teams play in their respective NPL or FQPL Queensland competitions.

The club was founded in 2012 by a new entity called Football Ipswich, set up by local football clubs to represent the Greater Ipswich Region and surrounding Western Corridor.

Pride were inaugural members of the Men and Women's NPL Queensland competitions, the 2nd tier of Australian football.

In 2023 it was announced that Pride and Ipswich City FC would merge ahead of the 2024 season, with the new club being called Ipswich FC.

== Senior Men managers ==
Period	Name
2012–2014	Kasey Wehrman
2015	Karl Dodd
2015	Karla Reuter and Wayne Heath (Caretakers)
2015–2018	Graham Harvey (football manager)
2018	Reggie Davani (Caretaker)
2018–2019	Sergio Raimundo
2019	Terry Kirkham
2019–2020	Andrew Catton
2020–2022	Brian Hastings

== Senior Women managers ==
2014–2015	Byron Hellmuth
2015	Lorena Maggio
2016	Len Manwaring
2017–2019	Belinda Kitching
2019	Connor George (caretaker)
2020	George Kalogeridis
2021	Trent Gregson
2021-2022	Pye Augustine
2022-	Russell Yarrow

== Senior Men squad ==
Note: Flags indicate national team as defined under FIFA eligibility rules; some limited exceptions apply. Players may hold more than one non-FIFA nationality.

No.	Pos.	Nation	Player
—	GK	AUS	Ashton Bonsall
—	GK	AUS	Josh Boyle
—	DF	AUS	Aaron Buzinki
—	DF	AUS	Kelton Scriggins
—	DF	AUS	Noah Humphrey
—	DF	AUS	Daniel Kovacevic
—	DF	AUS	Ben Piper
—	DF	AUS	Alex Hastings
—	DF	AUS	Mark Ingerson
—	DF	AUS	Mikhail Hastings

No.	Pos.	Nation	Player
—	MF	AUS	Adam Sawyer
—	MF	AUS	Ryan Stieler
—	MF	AUS	Logan Harmer
—	MF	AUS	Braydon Doolan
—	MF	FRA	Ferdinand Annor
—	MF	AUS	Will Asante
—	FW	AUS	Patient Lukonga
—	FW	ENG	Jack Webb

== Senior Women squad ==
Note: Flags indicate national team as defined under FIFA eligibility rules; some limited exceptions apply. Players may hold more than one non-FIFA nationality.

No.	Pos.	Nation	Player
—	GK	AUS	Beth Moran
—	GK	AUS	Imarnie Fatnowna
—	GK	AUS	Kyra Mills
—	DF	AUS	Lauren Brimelow
—	DF	AUS	Marin Austin-Barlow
—	DF	AUS	Emily Evetts
—	DF	AUS	Emma Barnes
—	DF	AUS	Meg Krautz
—	DF	AUS	April Gleeson
—	MF	AUS	Bronti Hogkinson

No.	Pos.	Nation	Player
—	MF	AUS	Jascinta Perrin
—	MF	AUS	Alana Giggins
—	MF	AUS	Giselle Heck
—	MF	AUS	Olivia Brown
—	MF	AUS	Imogen Noon
—	FW	AUS	Meaghan McElligott
—	FW	AUS	Charli Phillips

== Honours ==
2017: National Premier Leagues Queensland Champions

== Competition history (Senior Men) ==
Season	League												FFA Cup
Season	Division (tier)	Pld	W	D	L	GF	GA	GD	Pts	Position	Queensland Finals	NPL Finals	FFA Cup
2013	NPL Queensland (2)	22	6	3	11	41	49	−8	21	8th	DNQ	DNQ	Not yet founded
2014	NPL Queensland (2)	24	5	0	19	39	73	−34	15	12th	DNQ	DNQ	Preliminary Round 4
2015	NPL Queensland (2)	22	7	2	13	39	57	−18	23	11th	DNQ	DNQ	Preliminary Round 5
2016	NPL Queensland (2)	22	6	6	10	39	43	−5	24	10th	DNQ	DNQ	Preliminary Round 5
2017	NPL Queensland (2)	22	12	5	5	73	27	46	41	3rd	Champions	DNQ	Preliminary Round 5
2018	NPL Queensland (2)	26	19	0	7	96	33	63	57	3rd	Semi Final	DNQ	Preliminary Round 5
2019	NPL Queensland (2)	28	8	1	19	37	70	−33	25	13th	DNQ	DNQ	Preliminary Round 5
2020	FQPL (2)	20	9	1	10	42	46	−4	28	7th	DNQ	DNQ	

Key:	Premiers / Champions	Promoted ↑	Relegated ↓

The tier is the level in the Australian soccer league system

== Competition history (Senior Women) ==
Season	League										
Season	Division (tier)	Pld	W	D	L	GF	GA	GD	Pts	Position	Queensland Finals
2014	SEQ Premier League (2)	19	0	0	19	18	108	−90	0	14th	DNQ
2015	NPL Queensland (2)	20	6	1	13	42	94	−52	19	8th	DNQ
2016	NPL Queensland (2)	20	5	2	13	18	48	−30	17	8th	DNQ
2017	NPL Queensland (2)	18	1	0	17	11	76	−65	3	10th	DNQ
2018	NPL Queensland (2)	26	6	2	18	61	110	−49	20	11th	DNQ
2019	NPL Queensland (2)	24	3	2	19	28	95	−67	11	11th	DNQ
2020*	NPL Queensland (2)	1	0	0	1	0	4	−4	NA	NA	DNQ

Key:	Premiers / Champions	Promoted ↑	Relegated ↓

The tier is the level in the Australian soccer league system

- Western Pride withdrew from the Senior Women's competition after one match of the 2020 season.

== Background ==
With no existing Ipswich clubs in a position to apply for the newly formed NPL Queensland in 2012, a decision was made to work together to create a representative club for the region. New Pride President Todd Hunt had been calling for Ipswich clubs to work together for the sake of footballers in the region since 2007.

Before World War II, Ipswich had been an important region for Australian football, with a number of Australia national soccer team representatives hailing from the region, including the Socceroos' first captain Alex Gibb.

Ipswich clubs Dinmore Bushrats, Bundamba Rovers, Blackstone Rangers and St Helens won 19 Brisbane Premierships between 1920 and 1957. However, ethnic community clubs formed after World War II migration brought professionalism to club football, drawing players from Ipswich to Brisbane, seeing the fortunes of Ipswich clubs wane. Ipswich would see a brief return to dominance in the mid-1980s when Ipswich United (1985 Premiership/Championship double) and Coalstars SC (1986 Championship) saw the last time the region won a Men's title in the highest division.

Ipswich continued to produce international and professional footballers, but the rate slowed dramatically. Most recently Coalstars SC produced Australia women's national soccer team FIFA Women's World Cup players Belinda Kitching and Bryony Duus, Socceroo Neil Kilkenny, and Everton F.C., Stoke City F.C. and Crewe Alexandra F.C. goalkeeper Jason Kearton.

Western Pride was created in 2012 when a group of Ipswich football identities and local clubs Ipswich Knights FC, Western Spirit FC, Ipswich City FC, Springfield United and Colleges United formed Football Ipswich with a view of creating a club to meet the entry requirements to the then Australian Premier League (now National Premier Leagues Queensland).

Western Pride was created to provide a more professional pathway for Ipswich youngsters within the city, having seen many young Ipswich players move to successful Brisbane clubs such as Olympic FC and Queensland Lions FC.

== History ==
Pride's inaugural men's player/coach was former Socceroo Kasey Wehrman who led the team from 2012 until his resignation in July 2014 to return to Norway.

In October 2014, former A-League player Karl Dodd accepted the position of Head Coach of the Western Pride FC Senior Men's Team in the National Premier League (Qld). Former Matilda Karla Reuter signed on as Assistant Manager of the Men's team.

Dodd led the team to an impressive start to the season, however in June 2015 he was recruited by Brisbane Roar FC to take up a position as the High Performance Manager.

Dodd was replaced by former Whitsunday Miners FC coach Graham Harvey.

Pride Women's team first appeared in the SEQ Premier League, and were coached by Byron Hellmuth. In 2015 Pride gained a licence to the newly formed NPL Queensland Women's competition. Byron Hellmuth and New player/coach Lorena Maggio led the team to an 8th-placed finish.

On 18 May 2016 Pride Men played the New Zealand national football team at Briggs Rd Sporting Complex as part of the visitors preparations for the OFC Nations Cup. New Zealand prevailed 2–0 in front of a crowd of 1,200 fans.

Pride Men signed Papua New Guinea international Nigel Dabinyaba late in the season, who became the first current international to play in the NPL Queensland competition.

Two of Pride's 2016 squad were signed by Brisbane Roar's Youth team. Hayden Mchenery signed mid-season after 12 months at Pride where he rebuilt his career after suffering osteitis pubis. Joe Duckworth signed at the end of the season after top scoring for Pride with 11 goals in 21 appearances.

== 2017 season ==
Former Australia women's national soccer team goalkeeper and Ipswich player Belinda Kitching was appointed manager of the Senior Women side during the off-season.

Kitching was joined by her former Ipswich and international teammate Bryony Duus who took up the role of U17 manager and assistant coach to the Senior Women's squad.

Former playerHarrison Sawyer re-signed for the Men's side after stints at A-League sides Brisbane Roar and Newcastle United Jets. He scored four hat-tricks in five games, and 15 goals in his 7 games back with the club before returning to professional football in the Philippines.

In the final round of the regular season Pride Men secured a historic 3rd-placed finish and a first-ever club finals series following a run of 9 straight victories. Pride won the right to host the Grand Final after defeating Gold Coast City FC 3–0 in the semi-final, and seeing Premiers Brisbane Strikers lose to 4th place Moreton Bay United FC in the other semi.

Pride defeated Moreton Bay 2–1 in the Grand Final at Briggs Rd in front of a crowd of 3383. Goals from Cameron Crestani and a last minute Dylan Wenzel-Halls free-kick gave Pride its first major trophy.

Two weeks earlier Pride's U18 Boys won the Premiership – the club's first competition win at any level in its five-year history.

Pride Women finished second-last after a string of injuries deprived the team of many of its experienced players. A decision was taken to promote U17 players with a view to giving them experience ahead of the 2018 season.

== 2018 season ==
Striker Dylan Wenzel-Halls scored 23 goals in 11 appearances, before being signed by Brisbane Roar on a professional contract.

Coach Graham Harvey lead Pride to 2nd in the table by Round 16, before departing to take up a professional contract in Hong Kong.

== Notable players ==
- List of current and former players who played professionally or have represented their nation at senior level.

Afghanistan

- (Afghanistan) Zelfy Nazary

Australia

- (Australia) Kasey Wehrman

Papua New Guinea

- (Papua New Guinea) Nigel Dabinyaba

Samoa

- (Samoa) Mariecamilla Ah Ki

A-League

- (Australia) Russell Woodruffe
- (Australia) Harry Sawyer
- (Australia) Cameron Crestani
- (Australia) Dylan Wenzel-Halls
- (Australia) Adam Sawyer
- (Australia) Alex Parsons (footballer, born 2000)
- (Australia) Daniel Hall (soccer)

W-League

- (Australia) Lorena Maggio
- (Australia) Elli Chapple
- (Australia) Danielle Ward
- (Australia) Meaghan McElligott
- (Australia) Abbey Lloyd
- (Australia) Kara Mowbray

Singapore Premier League

- (Australia) Andy Pengelly

South African Premier League

- (South Africa) Alistair Wallis
