= Tobias Mikkelsen =

Danish footballer (born 1986)

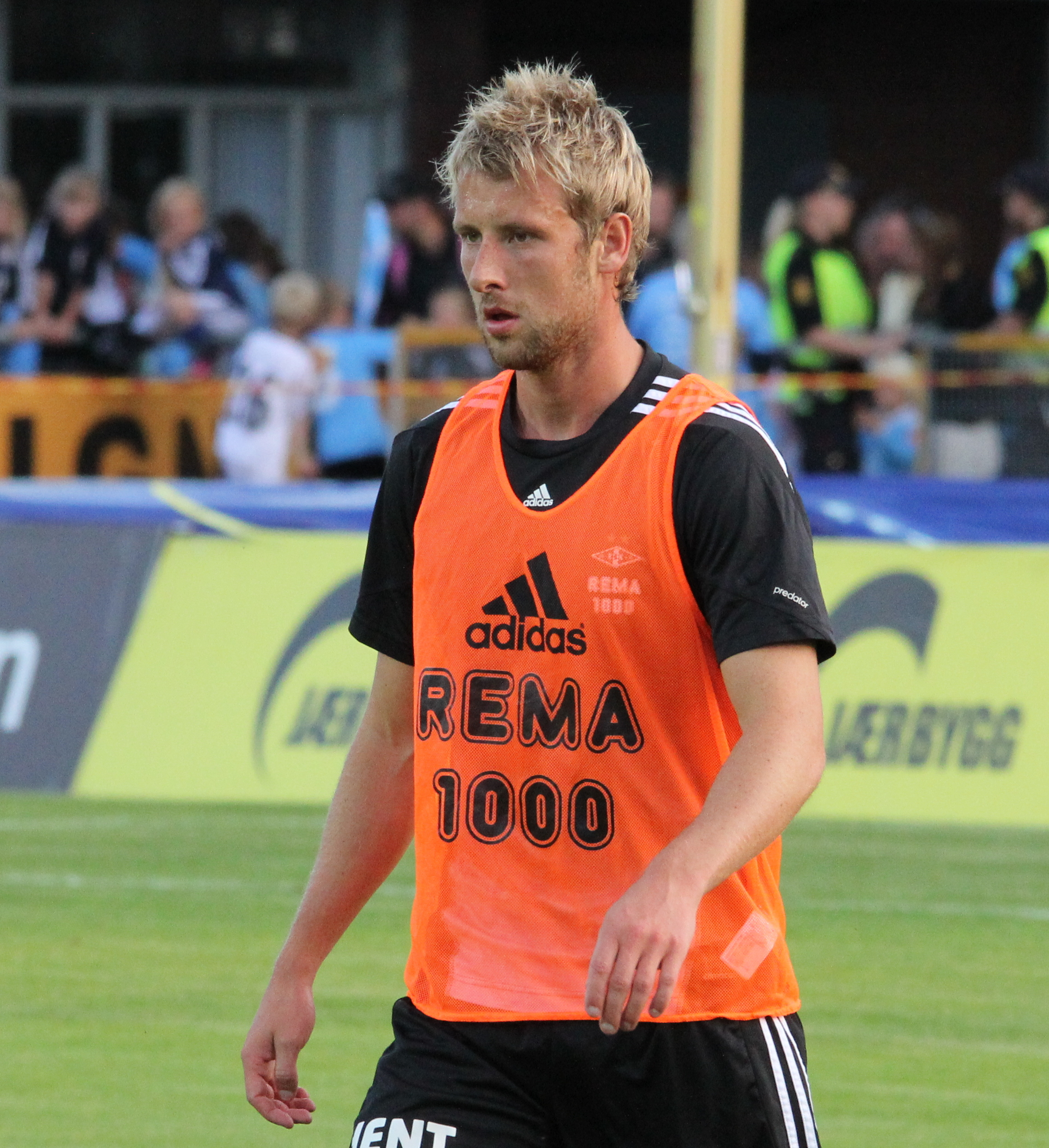
- Mikkelsen with Rosenborg in 2013

Personal information
- Full name: Tobias Pilegaard Mikkelsen
- Date of birth: 18 September 1986 (age 40)
- Place of birth: Helsingør, Denmark
- Height: 1.78 m (5 ft 10 in)
- Position: Winger

Youth career
- Helsingør IF
- Humlebæk BK

Senior career*
Years	Team	Apps	(Gls)
2004–2007	Lyngby BK	16	(3)
2007–2009	Brøndby	35	(2)
2009–2012	Nordsjælland	76	(13)
2012–2013	SpVgg Greuther Fürth	6	(0)
2013–2015	Rosenborg	80	(14)
2016–2018	Nordsjælland	39	(5)
2018–2019	Brisbane Roar	18	(3)
2019	Helsingborgs IF	8	(2)
Total		278	(45)

International career^{‡}
2006	Denmark U20	1	(1)
2007–2008	Denmark U21	10	(0)
2011–2012	Denmark	8	(1)
- * Club domestic league appearances and goals as of 9 August 2019 ‡ National team caps and goals as of 03:35, 14 November 2012 (UTC)

Tobias Pilegaard Mikkelsen (Danish pronunciation: [ˈme̝kl̩sn̩]; born 18 September 1986) is a Danish former professional footballer who played as a winger. He last played for Helsingborgs IF in the Allsvenskan. He has eight senior caps for Denmark, as well as a total of 11 youth caps with the U20 and U21 teams.

== Club career ==
=== Brøndby ===
After helping Lyngby BK gain promotion to the Danish Superliga, Mikkelsen switched to league rivals Brøndby IF in the summer of 2007. On 21 July 2007, he made an impressive home debut for Brøndby in their match against FC Nordsjælland scoring a goal and also notching an assist a 2–2 draw. He was signed to fill in the right winger spot in a 4–3–3 system, but coach Tom Køhlert and later Kent Nielsen decided to use a 4–4–2 formation which resulted in sparse time on the pitch for the young winger.

=== Nordsjælland ===
On 18 August 2009, Mikkelsen signed for FC Nordsjælland. In Nordsjælland Mikkelsen won the Danish Cup twice, in 2010 and 2011. In the 2011–12 season, he won the Danish Superliga with Nordsjælland for the first time, which provided direct qualification for the Champions League.

=== Greuther Fürth ===
On 26 July 2012, Mikkelsen signed a three-year deal with German outfit SpVgg Greuther Fürth.

=== Rosenborg ===
On 16 January 2013, Mikkelsen signed a four-year contract with Norwegian side Rosenborg BK.

On 30 July 2015, he scored a brace in a 3–2 win over Hungarian side Debreceni in the first leg of the Europa League third qualifying round.

On 25 October 2015, Mikkelsen helped Rosenborg win the 2015 Tippeligaen with two rounds left. A month later, Rosenborg secured the double, winning 2–0 in the final of the Norwegian Cup against Sarpsborg 08.

=== Nordsjælland ===
On 8 January 2016, Mikkelsen returned to his former club FC Nordsjælland signing a two-year deal.

=== Brisbane Roar ===
In May 2018 Mikkelsen was linked with a move to Australian club Brisbane Roar and subsequently signed a one-year contract in June. Mikkelsen made his Roar debut in the FFA Cup in August 2018 at home to Melbourne City

== International career ==
Mikkelsen received his first international call up to the Danish national team in November 2011, to face Sweden and Finland, making his debut for Denmark against Finland 15 November 2011.

Mikkelsen was once again called up in December 2011, for Denmark's tour of Thailand in January.

=== International goals ===
Scores and results list Denmark's goal tally first.

#	Date	Venue	Opponent	Score	Result	Competition	Ref
1.	15 August 2012	TRE-FOR Park, Odense	Slovakia	1–0	1–3	Friendly	

== Career statistics ==
As of 4 June 2018

Club	Season	League			Cup		Europe		Total	
Club	Season	Division	Apps	Goals	Apps	Goals	Apps	Goals	Apps	Goals
Brøndby	2007–08	Superliga	19	2	—		—		19	2
Brøndby	2008–09	Superliga	5	0	—		5	0	10	0
Brøndby	Total		24	2	0	0	5	0	29	2
Nordsjælland	2009–10	Superliga	17	2	4	0	—		21	2
Nordsjælland	2010–11	Superliga	28	4	3	0	2	0	33	4
Nordsjælland	2011–12	Superliga	31	7	2	0	2	0	35	7
Nordsjælland	2012–13	Superliga	2	0	—		—		2	0
Nordsjælland	Total		78	13	9	0	4	0	91	13
Greuther Fürth	2012–13	Bundesliga	6	0	1	0	—		7	0
Greuther Fürth	Total		6	0	1	0	0	0	7	0
Rosenborg	2013	Tippeligaen	27	3	5	2	4	1	37	6
Rosenborg	2014	Tippeligaen	26	3	3	1	4	0	33	4
Rosenborg	2015	Tippeligaen	27	8	2	0	13	4	42	12
Rosenborg	Total		80	14	10	3	21	5	109	22
Nordsjælland	2015–16	Superliga	8	3	—		—		8	3
Nordsjælland	2016–17	Superliga	19	1	—		—		19	1
Nordsjælland	2017–18	Superliga	12	1	—		—		12	1
Nordsjælland	Total		39	5	0	0	0	0	39	5
Career total			227	34	20	3	30	5	277	42

== Honours ==
=== Club ===
Nordsjælland

- Danish Superliga: 2011–12
- Danish Cup (2): 2009–10, 2010–11

Rosenborg

- Tippeligaen: 2015
- Norwegian Football Cup: 2015
