= Izaack Powell =

Australian association football player

Personal information
- Full name: Izaack Jacob Powell
- Date of birth: 12 February 2002 (age 24)
- Place of birth: Brisbane, Australia
- Height: 1.75 m (5 ft 9 in)
- Position: Left back

Team information
- Current team: Peninsula Power

Youth career
- Moreton Bay United
- 2017: QAS NTC
- 2018–2021: Brisbane Roar

Senior career*
Years	Team	Apps	(Gls)
2018–2021	Brisbane Roar NPL	36	(0)
2019–2021	Brisbane Roar	10	(0)
2023–	Peninsula Power	0	(0)

International career^{‡}
2019	Australia U17	7	(0)
- * Club domestic league appearances and goals as of 11 November 2021 ‡ National team caps and goals as of 12 November 2019

Izaack Jacob Powell (born 12 February 2002) is an Australian professional footballer who played as a left back for Brisbane Roar.

== Career ==
=== Brisbane Roar ===
Powell was part of the 2018-19 Y-League championship winning Brisbane Roar Youth team. He started and played the full 90 minutes as the Young Roar beat Western Sydney Wanderers Youth 3–1 in the 2019 Y-League Grand Final on 1 February 2019.

Powell made his professional debut for Brisbane Roar in a 2–1 win against Sydney FC on 8 February 2019 at the age of 16 years, 11 months and 28 days. In doing so he became the youngest player to play for the club. On 4 March 2019 after 2 senior A-League appearances, Powell signed a one-year scholarship deal with Brisbane Roar.

In June 2021, Powell was diagnosed with leukemia and he revealed it four months later. His contract with Brisbane Roar had expired at the end of the 2020–21 A-League season, but the club will offer him a new contract when he is ready to return.

== International career ==
On 2 October 2019, Powell was selected in the Joeys squad for the 2019 FIFA U-17 World Cup. He started in all of the Joeys' Group B games, providing an assist for Noah Botic's goal in their 2–1 loss to Ecuador. He started in their Round of 16 clash with France on 7 November 2019, losing 4–0 and being eliminated from the competition.

== Honours ==
Brisbane Roar

- Y-League: 2018–19
