= Aaron Reardon (soccer) =

Australian soccer player

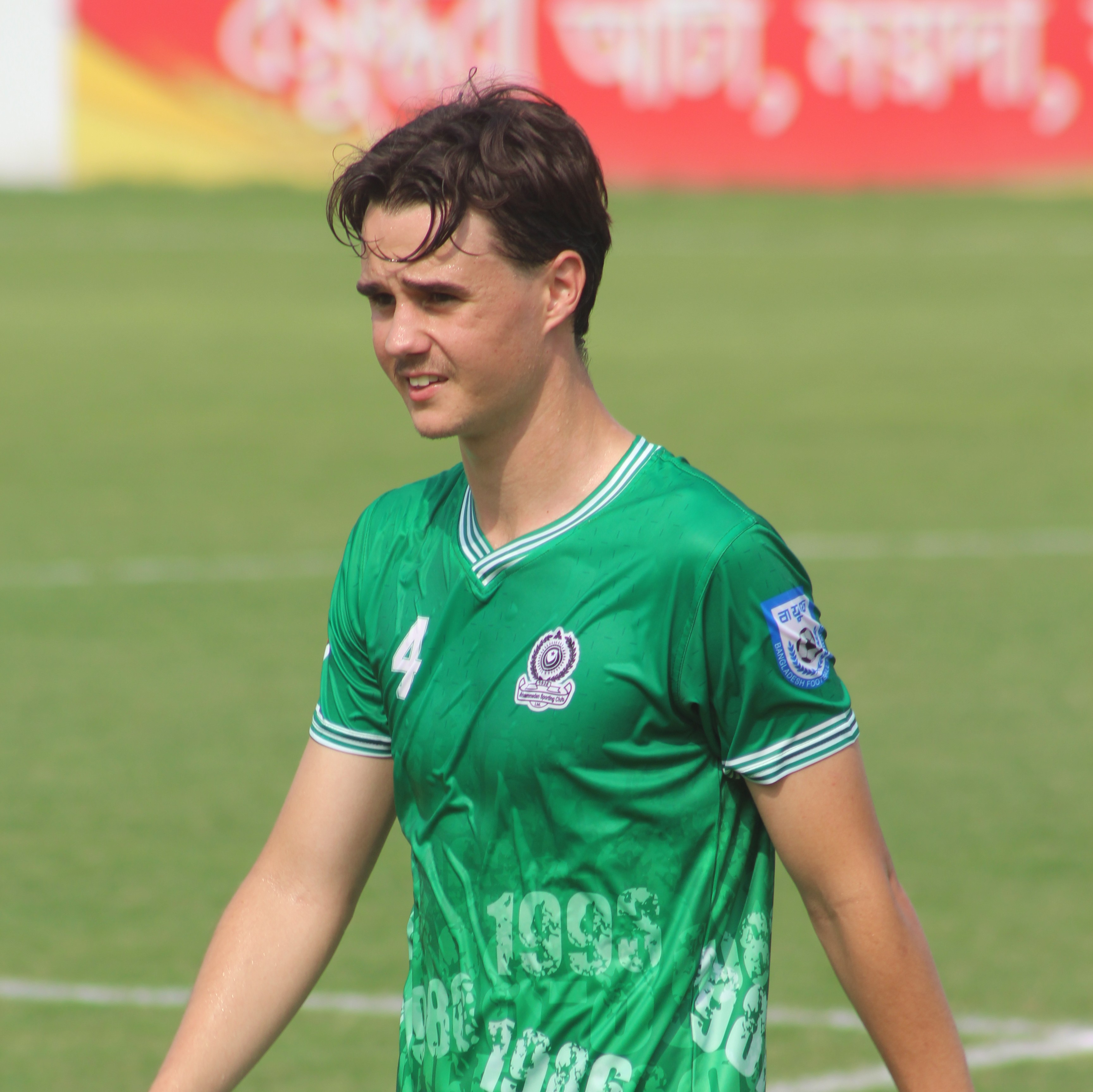
- Reardon with Dhaka Mohammedan in 2022

Personal information
- Full name: Aaron Reardon
- Date of birth: 11 March 1999 (age 27)
- Place of birth: Gold Coast, Australia
- Height: 1.88 m (6 ft 2 in)
- Position: Centre back

Team information
- Current team: Gold Coast Knights

Youth career
- Brisbane Strikers
- 2016–2020: Brisbane Roar

Senior career*
Years	Team	Apps	(Gls)
2015	FFA CoE	11	(0)
2016–2020	Brisbane Roar NPL	53	(5)
2019–2020	Brisbane Roar	4	(0)
2020	Gold Coast Knights	10	(1)
2021	Port Melbourne SC	13	(0)
2021–2022	Dhaka Mohammedan	16	(0)
2023	Gold Coast Knights	21	(0)
2023–2024	Brisbane Roar	2	(0)
2024–	Gold Coast Knights	1	(1)
- * Club domestic league appearances and goals as of 24 February 2024

Aaron Reardon (born 11 March 1999) is an Australian professional soccer player who plays as a centre back for Gold Coast Knights in NPL Queensland.

== Career ==
=== FFA CoE ===
In 2015, Reardon joined FFA CoE on a year's long scholarship leading up to the FIFA U-17 World Cup but did not debut or feature for the national team.

=== Brisbane Roar ===
Reardon signed his first professional contract with Brisbane Roar on 27 September 2018, penning a multi-year deal with the club. He made his professional A-League debut for the Roar on 2 January 2019, starting in a 2–2 draw against the Newcastle Jets at McDonald Jones Stadium.

Reardon was part of the 2018-19 Y-League championship winning Brisbane Roar Youth team, captaining the Young Roar to a 3–1 over Western Sydney Wanderers Youth in the 2019 Y-League Grand Final on 1 February 2019.

Reardon was released by the Roar on 7 September 2020, at the conclusion of the 2019-2020 A-League season.

=== Gold Coast Knights ===
On 18 September 2020, Gold Coast Knights announced Reardon had signed on for the remainder of the NPL Queensland season.

=== Port Melbourne ===
On 10 December 2020, Port Melbourne SC announced it had signed Reardon for the 2021 NPL Victoria season.

== Honours ==
Brisbane Roar Youth

- Y-League: 2018–19

Gold Coast Knights

- NPL Queensland Premiership: 2023
- NPL Queensland Championship: 2023
- Kappa Pro Series: 2023
