= Adam Sawyer =

Australian soccer player (born 1999)

Personal information
- Full name: Adam Sawyer
- Date of birth: 7 January 1999 (age 27)
- Place of birth: Melbourne, Australia
- Position: Midfielder

Team information
- Current team: Western Pride

Youth career
- Brisbane City
- 2015–2018: Brisbane Roar

Senior career*
Years	Team	Apps	(Gls)
2015–2018	Brisbane Roar NPL	52	(2)
2017–2018	Brisbane Roar	1	(0)
2019	Lions FC	25	(1)
2020	Western Pride	8	(0)
2021	Brisbane City	5	(0)
2022–	Western Pride	13	(1)
- * Club domestic league appearances and goals as of 23 September 2022

Adam Sawyer (born 7 January 1999) is an Australian professional footballer who plays as a midfielder for Western Pride FC in the National Premier Leagues Queensland.

Sawyer made his only A-League appearance as a late substitute in Brisbane Roar's 1–1 draw with Melbourne Victory FC on Saturday 11 November 2017.

In 2019. Sawyer made 25 appearances for Lions FC which won the NPL Queensland Premiership in 2019.

Sawyer joined Western Pride before the start of the 2020 season. He joined Brisbane City for the 2021 season, before returning to Western Pride at the end of the season.
