= 2016–17 Melbourne City FC season =

Melbourne City
2016–17 season
- Owner: City Football Group
- Chairman: Khaldoon Al Mubarak
- Manager: John van 't Schip (to 3 January 2017); Michael Valkanis (from 3 January 2017)
- Stadium: AAMI Park
- A-League: 4th
- A-League Finals: Elimination-finals
- FFA Cup: Winners
- Top goalscorer: League: Bruno Fornaroli (17); All: Bruno Fornaroli (20)
- Highest home attendance: 24,706 vs. Melbourne Victory (17 December 2016); A-League
- Lowest home attendance: 7,745 vs. Newcastle Jets (10 November 2016); A-League
- Average home league attendance: 10,499
- Biggest win: 5–1 vs. Wellington Phoenix (18 February 2017); A-League; 4–0 vs. Newcastle Jets (18 March 2017); A-League
- Biggest defeat: 0–3 vs. Sydney FC (1 April 2017); A-League
Home colours	Away colours

The 2016–17 season was the seventh in the history of Melbourne City Football Club. In addition to the domestic league, the club competed in the FFA Cup for the third time.

The club won the FFA Cup, its first ever silverware as a senior men's team. On 3 January 2017, manager John van 't Schip resigned from his position to return to the Netherlands and help care for his terminally-ill father. Michael Valkanis was subsequently appointed manager for the remainder of the season.

== Players ==
Note: Flags indicate national team as defined under FIFA eligibility rules; some limited exceptions apply. Players may hold more than one non-FIFA nationality.

No.	Pos.	Nation	Player
1	GK	DEN	Thomas Sørensen
2	DF	MLT	Manny Muscat
3	DF	AUS	Joshua Rose
5	DF	AUS	Ivan Franjic
6	DF	AUS	Osama Malik
7	FW	AUS	Corey Gameiro
8	MF	AUS	Neil Kilkenny
9	MF	ARG	Nicolás Colazo (on loan from Boca Juniors)
10	MF	AUS	Anthony Cáceres (on loan from Manchester City)
11	MF	AUS	Bruce Kamau
12	FW	AUS	Nick Fitzgerald
14	FW	AUS	Daniel Arzani
17	FW	AUS	Tim Cahill

No.	Pos.	Nation	Player
18	DF	AUS	Paulo Retre
20	GK	AUS	Dean Bouzanis
21	DF	AUS	Ruon Tongyik
22	DF	DEN	Michael Jakobsen
23	FW	URU	Bruno Fornaroli (captain)
26	MF	AUS	Luke Brattan (on loan from Manchester City)
27	MF	ARG	Fernando Brandán (on loan from Temperley)
28	FW	AUS	Steve Kuzmanovski
29	FW	AUS	Braedyn Crowley
34	MF	AUS	Denis Genreau
36	DF	AUS	Dylan Pierias
42	GK	AUS	James Delianov

== Transfers ==
=== From youth squad ===
N	Pos.	Nat.	Name	Age	Notes
34	MF	(Australia)	Denis Genreau	17	
36	DF	(Australia)	Dylan Pierias	17	
42	GK	(Australia)	James Delianov	17	

=== Transfers in ===
No.	Position	Player	Transferred from	Type/fee	Contract length	Date	Ref
2	DF	(Malta) Manny Muscat	Wellington Phoenix	Free transfer	2 years	3 March 2016	
11	MF	Bruce Kamau	Adelaide United	Free transfer	2 years	6 May 2016	
14	FW	Daniel Arzani	Unattached	Free transfer	2 years	10 June 2016	
26	MF	Luke Brattan	(England) Manchester City	Loan	1 year	29 June 2016	
21	DF	Ruon Tongyik	Adelaide United	Undisclosed Fee	2 years	8 July 2016	
8	MF	Neil Kilkenny	Unattached	Free transfer	2 years	19 July 2016	
27	MF	(Argentina) Fernando Brandán	(Argentina) Temperley	Loan	2 years	26 July 2016	
17	FW	Tim Cahill	Unattached	Free transfer	3 years	11 August 2016	
3	DF	Joshua Rose	Central Coast Mariners	Free transfer	1 year	12 August 2016	
22	DF	(Denmark) Michael Jakobsen	(Denmark) Esbjerg fB	Free transfer	2 years	1 September 2016	
29	FW	Braedyn Crowley	(Australia) Northcote City	Free transfer	2 years	6 September 2016	
9	MF	(Argentina) Nicolás Colazo	(Argentina) Boca Juniors	Loan	1 year	20 September 2016	

=== Transfers out ===
No.	Position	Player	Transferred to	Type/fee	Date	Ref
2	DF	Alex Wilkinson	Sydney FC	Free transfer	26 April 2016	
3	DF	(Northern Ireland) Aaron Hughes	Unattached	Free transfer	26 April 2016	
14	MF	James Brown	Unattached	Free transfer	28 April 2016	
16	MF	Jason Trifiro	Unattached	Free transfer	28 April 2016	
17	FW	(Sri Lanka) Wade Dekker	Unattached	Free transfer	28 April 2016	
26	FW	Marc Marino	Unattached	Free transfer	28 April 2016	
24	DF	Patrick Kisnorbo	Retired		1 May 2016	
11	DF	Michael Zullo	Sydney FC	Free transfer	12 May 2016	
19	DF	Ben Garuccio	Adelaide United	Free transfer	16 June 2016	
9	FW	(Martinique) Harry Novillo	(Turkey) Manisaspor	$500,000	22 June 2016	
8	MF	Aaron Mooy	(England) Manchester City	Free transfer	29 June 2016	
22	DF	Jack Clisby	Western Sydney Wanderers	Free transfer	12 August 2016	
25	MF	Jacob Melling	Western Sydney Wanderers	Free transfer	12 August 2016	
34	FW	Stefan Zinni	(Australia) South Melbourne	Undisclosed Fee	18 December 2016	
4	DF	Connor Chapman	(South Korea) Incheon United	Undisclosed Fee	23 January 2017	

=== Contract extensions ===
Name	Position	Duration	Contract Expiry	Notes
(Australia) Nick Fitzgerald	Attacking midfielder	2 years	2018	
(Australia) Anthony Cáceres	Central midfielder	1 year	2017	
(Uruguay) Bruno Fornaroli	Central striker	3 years	2019	
(Australia) Dean Bouzanis	Goalkeeper	3 years	2020	

== Pre-season and friendlies ==
Win Draw Loss

20 July 2016	Port Melbourne (Australia)	0–5	Melbourne City	Melbourne
19:15 AEST		Report	Fornaroli 28', 45+1' (pen.); Retre 67'; Melling 85'; Wong 86'	Stadium: SS Anderson Reserve

26 July 2016	Melbourne Knights (Australia)	0–4	Melbourne City	Melbourne
19:30 AEST		Report	Fornaroli 21', 47', 63'; Muscat 26'	Stadium: Knights Stadium

16 August 2016	Hume City (Australia)	1–0	Melbourne City	Melbourne
	Markelis 87'	Report		Stadium: ABD Stadium

17 August 2016	Melbourne City	1–0	Adelaide United	Melbourne
	Fornaroli 15' (pen.)	Report		Stadium: City Football Academy; Attendance: 0 (behind closed doors)

7 September 2016	Northern Fury (Australia)	1–4	Melbourne City	Townsville
19:00 AEST	Waples 71' (pen.)	Report	Kamau 5'; Brattan 18'; Crowley 48'; Ahmed 87'	Stadium: Townsville Sports Reserve; Attendance: 1,300; Referee: Jarred Gillett

11 September 2016	Melbourne City	1–4	Wellington Phoenix	Townsville
15:00 AEST	Cahill 15'	Report	Krishna 19', 45+1'; Finkler 40', 56'	Stadium: Townsville Sports Reserve; Attendance: 3,856

18 September 2016	Melbourne City	0–4	Newcastle Jets	Ballarat
15:00 AEST		Report	Nabbout 16'; Nordstrand 44', 71'; Brymora 79'	Stadium: Morshead Park; Referee: Jonathan Barreiro

25 September 2016 Family Day	Melbourne City	2–0	(New Zealand) Auckland City	Melbourne
10:00 AEST	Colazo 77'; Cahill 90'	Report		Stadium: City Football Academy

== Competitions ==
=== Overview ===
Competition	First match	Last match	Starting round	Final position	Record							
Competition	First match	Last match	Starting round	Final position	Pld	W	D	L	GF	GA	GD	Win %
A-League	8 October 2016	16 April 2017	Matchday 1	4th	27	11	6	10	49	44	+5	40.74
A-League Finals	23 April 2017		Elimination-finals	Elimination-finals	1	0	0	1	0	2	−2	0.00
FFA Cup	2 August 2016	30 November 2016	Round of 32	Winners	5	5	0	0	11	3	+8	100.00
Total					33	16	6	11	60	49	+11	48.48

Source: Competitions

=== A-League ===
==== League table ====
Pos	Team	Pld	W	D	L	GF	GA	GD	Pts	Qualification
1	Sydney FC (C)	27	20	6	1	55	12	+43	66	Qualification for 2018 AFC Champions League group stage and Finals series
2	Melbourne Victory	27	15	4	8	49	31	+18	49	Qualification for 2018 AFC Champions League group stage and Finals series
3	Brisbane Roar	27	11	9	7	43	37	+6	42	Qualification for 2018 AFC Champions League second preliminary round and Finals series
4	Melbourne City	27	11	6	10	49	44	+5	39	Qualification for Finals series
5	Perth Glory	27	10	9	8	53	53	0	39	Qualification for Finals series
6	Western Sydney Wanderers	27	8	12	7	35	35	0	36	Qualification for Finals series
7	Wellington Phoenix (Note: Wellington Phoenix cannot qualify for the AFC Champions League as they are not recognised as an AFC club.)	27	8	6	13	41	46	−5	30	
8	Central Coast Mariners	27	6	5	16	31	52	−21	23	
9	Adelaide United	27	5	8	14	25	46	−21	23	
10	Newcastle Jets	27	5	7	15	28	53	−25	22	

Source: A-Leagues
Rules for classification: 1) points; 2) goal difference; 3) number of goals scored.
(C) Champions

==== Results summary ====
Overall								Home						Away					
Pld	W	D	L	GF	GA	GD	Pts	W	D	L	GF	GA	GD	W	D	L	GF	GA	GD
27	11	6	10	49	44	+5	39	7	3	3	24	18	+6	4	3	7	25	26	−1

Source: ultimatealeague.com

==== Results by round ====
Round	1	2	3	4	5	6	7	8	9	10	11	12	13	14	15	16	17	18	19	20	21	22	23	24	25	26	27
Ground	A	A	H	H	A	H	A	H	H	A	H	H	A	H	A	H	A	A	H	A	H	A	H	A	A	H	A
Result	W	W	L	W	L	W	D	W	D	D	L	D	D	W	L	W	L	L	D	W	L	W	W	L	L	W	L
Position	2	2	3	2	3	2	2	2	2	2	4	4	4	3	3	3	4	4	4	3	4	3	3	3	4	3	4
Points	3	6	6	9	9	12	13	16	17	18	18	19	20	23	23	26	26	26	27	30	30	33	36	36	36	39	39

Source: Ultimate A-League
A = Away; H = Home; W = Win; D = Draw; L = Loss

==== Matches ====
8 October 2016 1	Wellington Phoenix	0–1	Melbourne City	Wellington
19:35 NZDT		Report	Cáceres 31'	Stadium: Westpac Stadium; Attendance: 10,034; Referee: Peter Green

15 October 2016 2	Melbourne Victory	1–4	Melbourne City	Melbourne
19:50 AEDT	Rojas 62'	Report	Cahill 27'; Fornaroli 31'; Brattan 52'; Brandán 63'	Stadium: Etihad Stadium; Attendance: 43,188; Referee: Chris Beath

21 October 2016 3	Melbourne City	2–3	Perth Glory	Melbourne
19:50 AEDT	Fornaroli 44' (pen.); Brandán 60'	Report	Keogh 7', 49', 85'	Stadium: AAMI Park; Attendance: 8,076; Referee: Alan Milliner

28 October 2016 4	Melbourne City	2–1	Adelaide United	Melbourne
19:50 AEDT	Fornaroli 11', 56' (pen.)	Report	Guardiola 64'	Stadium: AAMI Park; Attendance: 10,053; Referee: Chris Beath

4 November 2016 5	Brisbane Roar	1–0	Melbourne City	Brisbane
18:50 AEST	Maclaren 11'	Report		Stadium: Suncorp Stadium; Attendance: 20,198; Referee: Peter Green

10 November 2016 6	Melbourne City	2–1	Newcastle Jets	Melbourne
19:50 AEDT	Fornaroli 14', 26'	Report	Nabbout 36'	Stadium: AAMI Park; Attendance: 7,745; Referee: Adam Fielding

18 November 2016 7	Western Sydney Wanderers	1–1	Melbourne City	Sydney
19:50 AEDT	Kilkenny 90+2' (o.g.)	Report	Cahill 55'	Stadium: Spotless Stadium; Attendance: 14,232; Referee: Chris Beath

27 November 2016 8	Melbourne City	2–1	Wellington Phoenix	Melbourne
17:00 AEDT	Fitzgerald 44'; Fornaroli 71' (pen.)	Report	Krishna 60'	Stadium: AAMI Park; Attendance: 10,644; Referee: Kurt Ams

3 December 2016 9	Melbourne City	1–1	Brisbane Roar	Melbourne
19:50 AEDT	Colazo 54'	Report	Maclaren 38'	Stadium: AAMI Park; Attendance: 8,394; Referee: Shaun Evans

9 December 2016 10	Sydney FC	1–1	Melbourne City	Sydney
19:50 AEDT	Bobô 80' (pen.)	Report	Brandán 32'	Stadium: ANZ Stadium; Attendance: 14,668; Referee: Kris Griffiths-Jones

17 December 2016 11	Melbourne City	1–2	Melbourne Victory	Melbourne
19:50 AEDT	Cahill 16'	Report	Rojas 24'; Berisha 78'	Stadium: AAMI Park; Attendance: 24,706; Referee: Jarred Gillett

27 December 2016 12	Melbourne City	3–3	Perth Glory	Melbourne
19:50 AEDT	Cahill 9'; Fornaroli 36', 61' (pen.)	Report	Castro 21', 40'; Harold 64'	Stadium: AAMI Park; Attendance: 11,269; Referee: Shaun Evans

31 December 2016 13	Central Coast Mariners	2–2	Melbourne City	Gosford
19:00 AEDT	Buhagiar 77'; O'Donovan 85'	Report	Cahill 40'; Fornaroli 90' (pen.)	Stadium: Central Coast Stadium; Attendance: 11,184; Referee: Jonathan Barreiro

6 January 2017 14	Melbourne City	1–0	Western Sydney Wanderers	Melbourne
19:50 AEDT	Franjic 19'	Report		Stadium: AAMI Park; Attendance: 10,731; Referee: Alan Milliner

12 January 2017 15	Adelaide United	2–1	Melbourne City	Adelaide
19:30 ACDT	McGowan 10'; Ochieng 87'	Report	Fornaroli 4'	Stadium: Coopers Stadium; Attendance: 10,607; Referee: Jonathan Barreiro

19 January 2017 16	Melbourne City	2–1	Central Coast Mariners	Melbourne
19:50 AEDT	Cahill 3', 39'	Report	O'Donovan 9'	Stadium: AAMI Park; Attendance: 8,784; Referee: Daniel Elder

27 January 2017 17	Newcastle Jets	2–1	Melbourne City	Coffs Harbour
19:50 AEDT	Nabbout 14', 52'	Report	Fornaroli 69' (pen.)	Stadium: C.ex Coffs International Stadium; Attendance: 7,891; Referee: Kurt Ams

4 February 2017 18	Melbourne Victory	2–1	Melbourne City	Melbourne
19:50 AEDT	Berisha 84'; Muscat 86' (o.g.)	Report	Baró 70' (o.g.)	Stadium: Etihad Stadium; Attendance: 35,426; Referee: Chris Beath

11 February 2017 19	Melbourne City	2–2	Brisbane Roar	Melbourne
19:50 AEDT	Kamau 59'; Colazo 61' (pen.)	Report	Maclaren 34' (pen.), 45+1'	Stadium: AAMI Park; Attendance: 8,414; Referee: Alan Milliner

18 February 2017 20	Wellington Phoenix	1–5	Melbourne City	Wellington
19:35 NZDT	Barbarouses 70'	Report	Lowry 20' (o.g.); Fornaroli 29'; Cáceres 59'; Kilkenny 82'; Colazo 87'	Stadium: Westpac Stadium; Attendance: 6,131; Referee: Jonathan Barreiro

24 February 2017 21	Melbourne City	1–3	Sydney FC	Melbourne
19:50 AEDT	Fitzgerald 25'	Report	Bobô 24' (pen.), 67'; O'Neill 56'	Stadium: AAMI Park; Attendance: 10,706; Referee: Jarred Gillett

5 March 2017 22	Central Coast Mariners	2–3	Melbourne City	Gosford
17:00 AEDT	Ferreira 45'; Tongyik 47' (o.g.)	Report	Fornaroli 4', 64' (pen.); Montgomery 16' (o.g.)	Stadium: Central Coast Stadium; Attendance: 5,974; Referee: Adam Fielding

18 March 2017 23	Melbourne City	4–0	Newcastle Jets	Melbourne
19:50 AEDT	Cahill 12'; Fitzgerald 65'; Fornaroli 75' (pen.), 81'	Report		Stadium: AAMI Park; Attendance: 8,949; Referee: Chris Beath

24 March 2017 24	Western Sydney Wanderers	3–1	Melbourne City	Sydney
19:50 AEDT	Santalab 22', 64', 68'	Report	Kilkenny 3'	Stadium: Spotless Stadium; Attendance: 10,204; Referee: Jarred Gillett

1 April 2017 25	Sydney FC	3–0	Melbourne City	Sydney
19:50 AEDT	Brosque 57'; Bobô 64', 90+1'	Report		Stadium: Allianz Stadium; Attendance: 15,266; Referee: Peter Green

7 April 2017 26	Melbourne City	1–0	Adelaide United	Melbourne
19:50 AEST	Cahill 36'	Report		Stadium: AAMI Park; Attendance: 9,438; Referee: Kris Griffiths-Jones

16 April 2017 27	Perth Glory	5–4	Melbourne City	Perth
17:00 AWST	Castro 4' (pen.); Keogh 51'; Harold 55'; Marinković 75'; Taggart 88'	Report	Cahill 21', 80'; Colazo 84'; Fitzgerald 90'	Stadium: nib Stadium; Attendance: 12,261; Referee: Peter Green

==== Finals series ====
23 April 2017 Elimination-final	Melbourne City	0–2	Perth Glory	Melbourne
19:00 AEST		Report	Castro 16'; Chianese 30'	Stadium: AAMI Park; Attendance: 9,944; Referee: Chris Beath

=== FFA Cup ===
2 August 2016 Round of 32	Floreat Athena	1–2	Melbourne City	Perth
18:30 AWST	Gate 59'	Report	Fitzgerald 32'; Cáceres 65'	Stadium: Dorrien Gardens; Attendance: 1,408; Referee: Adam Fielding

24 August 2016 Round of 16	Brisbane Strikers	1–2	Melbourne City	Brisbane
19:30 AEST	Henslee 34'	Report	Fornaroli 37' (pen.), 78' (pen.)	Stadium: Perry Park; Attendance: 3,571; Referee: Peter Green

21 September 2016 Quarter-final	Melbourne City	4–1	Western Sydney Wanderers	Melbourne
19:30 AEST	Jakobsen 2'; Fornaroli 32'; Cahill 45' (pen.); Brandán 65'	Report	Dimas 73'	Stadium: AAMI Park; Attendance: 5,401; Referee: Jarred Gillett

25 October 2016 Semi-final	Melbourne Victory	0–2	Melbourne City	Melbourne
19:30 AEDT		Report	Brattan 9'; Brandán 77'	Stadium: AAMI Park; Attendance: 15,791; Referee: Shaun Evans

30 November 2016 Final	Melbourne City	1–0	Sydney FC	Melbourne
19:30 AEDT	Cahill 53'	Report		Stadium: AAMI Park; Attendance: 18,751; Referee: Peter Green

== Statistics ==
=== Appearances and goals ===
Includes all competitions. Players with no appearances not included in the list.

No.	Pos.	Nat.	Name	A-League		FFA Cup		Total	
No.	Pos.	Nat.	Name	Apps	Goals	Apps	Goals	Apps	Goals
1	GK	(Denmark)	Thomas Sørensen	7(1)	0	3	0	11	0
2	DF	(Malta)	Manny Muscat	12(2)	0	3	0	17	0
3	DF	(Australia)	Josh Rose	23	0	3	0	26	0
5	DF	(Australia)	Ivan Franjic	20(1)	1	1(1)	0	23	1
6	MF	(Australia)	Osama Malik	15(3)	0	4	0	22	0
8	MF	(Australia)	Neil Kilkenny	25	2	4	0	29	2
9	MF	(Argentina)	Nicolás Colazo	18(4)	4	1(1)	0	24	4
10	MF	(Australia)	Anthony Caceres	16(11)	2	3(1)	1	31	3
11	FW	(Australia)	Bruce Kamau	19(7)	1	4	0	30	1
12	FW	(Australia)	Nick Fitzgerald	9(14)	4	3(2)	1	28	5
14	FW	(Australia)	Daniel Arzani	0(6)	0	0(1)	0	7	0
17	FW	(Australia)	Tim Cahill	18(4)	11	3(1)	2	26	13
18	MF	(Australia)	Paulo Retre	4(7)	0	1(2)	0	14	0
20	GK	(Australia)	Dean Bouzanis	21(1)	0	2	0	24	0
21	DF	(Australia)	Ruon Tongyik	13(2)	0	0	0	15	0
22	DF	(Denmark)	Michael Jakobsen	17	0	3	1	20	1
23	FW	(Uruguay)	Bruno Fornaroli	27	17	5	3	32	20
26	MF	(Australia)	Luke Brattan	24(2)	1	5	1	31	2
27	MF	(Argentina)	Fernando Brandán	13(6)	3	3(2)	2	24	5
28	MF	(Australia)	Steve Kuzmanovski	0	0	0(1)	0	1	0
29	FW	(Australia)	Braedyn Crowley	0(1)	0	0	0	1	0
34	MF	(Australia)	Denis Genreau	2(2)	0	0	0	4	0
35	DF	(Australia)	Christian Cavallo	0(1)	0	0	0	1	0
36	DF	(Australia)	Dylan Pierias	1	0	0	0	1	0
—	DF	(Australia)	Bradley Clarke	0	0	0(1)	0	1	0
Player(s) transferred out but featured this season
4	MF	(Australia)	Connor Chapman	4(1)	0	3(1)	0	9	0
22	DF	(Australia)	Jack Clisby	0	0	1	0	1	0

=== Disciplinary record ===
Includes all competitions. The list is sorted by squad number when total cards are equal. Players with no cards not included in the list.

Rank	No.	Pos.	Nat.	Name	A-League			FFA Cup			Total		
Rank	No.	Pos.	Nat.	Name	Yellow card	Second yellow card	Red card	Yellow card	Second yellow card	Red card	Yellow card	Second yellow card	Red card
1	27	MF	(Argentina)	Fernando Brandán	5	0	1	1	0	0	6	0	1
2	17	FW	(Australia)	Tim Cahill	4	0	1	0	0	0	4	0	1
3	1	GK	(Australia)	Thomas Sørensen	0	0	1	0	0	0	0	0	1
4	2	DF	(Malta)	Manny Muscat	7	1	0	0	0	0	7	1	0
5	8	MF	(Australia)	Neil Kilkenny	10	0	0	0	0	0	10	0	0
6	6	MF	(Australia)	Osama Malik	9	0	0	0	0	0	9	0	0
7	26	MF	(Australia)	Luke Brattan	7	0	0	1	0	0	8	0	0
8	3	DF	(Australia)	Josh Rose	5	0	0	0	0	0	5	0	0
8	23	FW	(Uruguay)	Bruno Fornaroli	5	0	0	0	0	0	5	0	0
10	10	MF	(Australia)	Anthony Caceres	4	0	0	0	0	0	4	0	0
10	21	DF	(Australia)	Ruon Tongyik	4	0	0	0	0	0	4	0	0
10	22	DF	(Denmark)	Michael Jakobsen	3	0	0	1	0	0	4	0	0
13	9	MF	(Argentina)	Nicolás Colazo	3	0	0	0	0	0	3	0	0
13	18	MF	(Australia)	Paulo Retre	3	0	0	0	0	0	3	0	0
13	20	GK	(Australia)	Dean Bouzanis	3	0	0	0	0	0	3	0	0
16	5	DF	(Australia)	Ivan Franjic	2	0	0	0	0	0	2	0	0
16	12	FW	(Australia)	Nick Fitzgerald	1	0	0	1	0	0	2	0	0
16	34	MF	(Australia)	Denis Genreau	1	0	0	1	0	0	2	0	0
19	4	MF	(Australia)	Connor Chapman	1	0	0	0	0	0	1	0	0
19	11	FW	(Australia)	Bruce Kamau	1	0	0	0	0	0	1	0	0

=== Clean sheets ===
Includes all competitions. The list is sorted by squad number when total clean sheets are equal. Numbers in parentheses represent games where both goalkeepers participated and both kept a clean sheet; the number in parentheses is awarded to the goalkeeper who was substituted on, whilst a full clean sheet is awarded to the goalkeeper who was on the field at the start of play. Goalkeepers with no clean sheets not included in the list.

Rank	No.	Nat.	Goalkeeper	A-League	FFA Cup	Total
1	20	(Australia)	Dean Bouzanis	2 (1)	2	5
2	1	(Denmark)	Thomas Sørensen	1 (1)	0	2
Total				5	2	7
