= List of highest-scoring A-League Men matches =

This is a summary of the highest scoring games and biggest winning margins in the A-League since its establishment in the 2005–06 season. The record for the biggest win is by 8 goals, this occurred on 14 April 2024 when Melbourne City beat Perth Glory 8–0.

Previously the record for the biggest win was by 7 goals. This has occurred on four occasions being Adelaide United's 8–1 victory against North Queensland Fury on 21 January 2011, Melbourne City's 8–1 victory against Brisbane Roar on 28 December 2023, Adelaide United's 7–0 victory against Newcastle Jets on 24 January 2015 and Melbourne City's 7–0 victory against Melbourne Victory on 17 April 2021, and Melbourne City's 7–0 win over Western Sydney Wanderers on 12 March, 2024.

Only two games have had ten goals scored in the fourteen seasons of the A-League, both 8–2 results involving Central Coast Mariners. Eleven games have had nine goals scored.

== Highest scoring games ==
Goals scored	Date	Home team	Result	Away team	Goal scorers	Ref
10	14 April 2018	Central Coast Mariners	2–8	Newcastle Jets	Pain 39', Buhagiar 80'; Champness 10', O'Donovan 20', 68' (pen), McGree 24', 53', 75', Jackson 60', D. Petratos 81'	
10	9 March 2019	Central Coast Mariners	2–8	Wellington Phoenix	Clisby 61', Mallon 69'; Graham 8' (o.g.), Krishna 12', 45+1', Williams 21', Cacace 51', Singh 57, 88, Fenton 59'	
9	22 December 2007	Central Coast Mariners	4–5	Sydney FC	Jedinak 3', J. Aloisi 15', Owens 63' (pen), Kwasnik 86'; Fyfe 33', McFlynn 50', Biddle 71', Santalab 76', Talay 90' (pen)	
9	21 January 2011	Adelaide United	8–1	North Queensland Fury	Flores 4', 37', 87', T. Dodd 28', Ramsay 42', van Dijk 47', 67', 83'; Nikas 72'	
9	3 November 2012	Central Coast Mariners	7–2	Sydney FC	Rogić 17', 62', Ryall 29' (o.g.), McBreen 39' (pen), 65', 67', McGlinchey 56'; Yau 9', Abbas 54'	
9	14 March 2015	Sydney FC	5–4	Brisbane Roar	Jurman 7', Janko 38' (pen), 52', 76' (pen), Brosque 89'; Henrique 5', Kaluđerović 79' (pen), Lustica 84', Petratos 90'	
9	20 February 2016	Perth Glory	6–3	Brisbane Roar	Keogh 5', Harold 32', Marinković 38', Lowry 41', Castro 49' (pen), R. Garcia 86'; Maclaren 17', D. Petratos 28' (pen), North 36'	
9	24 April 2016	Western Sydney Wanderers	5–4	Brisbane Roar	Castelen 26', 53', 59', Šantalab 39', Vidošić 102'; D. Petratos 16' (pen), Andreu 20 (o.g.), Maclaren 23', 81'	
9	16 April 2017	Perth Glory	5–4	Melbourne City	Castro 5' (pen), Keogh 51', Harold 56', Marinković 75', Taggart 88'; Cahill 21', 80', Colazo 84', Fitzgerald 90'	
9	23 January 2021	Western United	5–4	Perth Glory	Sánchez 10', Pierias 60', 64' Imai 75', Lustica 84'; Armiento 56', 78', Fornaroli 58', D'Agostino 69'	
9	23 April 2021	Melbourne Victory	5–4	Western Sydney Wanderers	Folami 14', 45+3' Roux 28', Ryan 63', Butterfield 73'; Troisi 31', Dorrans 76' (pen), Duke 86', Müller 88'	
9	28 December 2023	Melbourne City	8–1	Brisbane Roar	Good 10', Maclaren 14', 34', 58', Natel 48', 70', Arslan 76', Mazzeo 85'; Brownlie 62'	
9	14 March 2025	Adelaide United	4–5	Macarthur FC	Ayoubi 13', Kitto 19', Mauk 42', Goodwin 73'; Ikonomidis 8', Adamson 10', Brattan 53', 83', Jakoliš 58'	
8	14 April 2024	Melbourne City	8–0	Perth Glory	Natel 14',28', Arslan 16', 26', 73', Majekodunmi 19' (o.g.), Maclaren 60', Ugarkovic 86'	
8	16 January 2010	Melbourne Victory	6–2	Perth Glory	A. Thompson 5', Kruse 12', 26', 40', K. Muscat 81' (pen), Hernández 83'; Vargas 23' (o.g.), Sterjovski 52'	
8	28 October 2011	Brisbane Roar	7–1	Adelaide United	Henrique 20' (pen), 36 (pen), Berisha 23', 26', 28', 69, Nakajima-Farran 80'; Vidošić 5'	
8	19 January 2013	Sydney FC	7–1	Wellington Phoenix	J. Griffiths 11', Del Piero 21', 23' (pen), 39', 70', Culina 26', Yau 84'; Sigmund 80'	
8	23 February 2013	Central Coast Mariners	6–2	Melbourne Victory	Duke 18', 32', McGlinchey 56', 86', 90', Fitzgerald 81'; Milligan 23' (pen), Sainsbury 69' (o.g.)	
8	22 February 2019	Central Coast Mariners	3–5	Brisbane Roar	Pain 38', O'Neill 45+2', Murray 82'; Bauthéac 31, López 36, 54, Mikkelsen 45, Wenzel-Halls 74'	
8	25 April 2019	Brisbane Roar	3–5	Adelaide United	Wenzel-Halls 35', D'Agostino 45+5', Bauthéac 61' (pen.); Mileusnic 4', Blackwood 51', Goodwin 68', Diawara 75', Isaías 85'	
8	21 December 2019	Perth Glory	6–2	Newcastle Jets	Castro 15', 83', Kilkenny 33' (pen.), Chianese 46', Fornaroli 58', 70; Topor-Stanley 26', Ugarkovic 51'	
8	1 March 2020	Western United	6–2	Central Coast Mariners	Berisha 9', 89', Burgess 25', 30', 43', Durante 61'; Harold 19' (pen.), Stensness 45'	
8	20 January 2021	Perth Glory	5–3	Adelaide United	Kilkenny 10' (pen.), D'Agostino 34', 60', Fornaroli 51', Armiento 84'; Konstandopoulos 42', M. Toure 88', Halloran 90+3'	
8	19 February 2023	Adelaide United	4–4	Western Sydney Wanderers	Ibusuki 32' (pen.), 67, Popovic 45+4', Kitto 79'; Borrello 45+1', 50', Nieuwenhof 63', Layouni 90+5'	
8	23 April 2023	Perth Glory	4–4	Adelaide United	R. Williams 32', Taggart 60', 90+6', Zimarino 90+3'; Jovanovic 34', Goodwin 51', Kitto 78', Irankunda 90+9',	
8	29 October 2023	Melbourne Victory	5–3	Newcastle Jets	Fornaroli 8', 31', 40' (pen.), 45+3', Velupillay 55'; Natta 6', Taylor 49', 74'	
8	28 April 2024	Sydney FC	7–1	Perth Glory	Courtney-Perkins 5', Lolley 41', 90+1, Brattan 45+2, (pen.), Mak 68', 74', King 81'; Taggart 58'	
8	30 November 2024	Macarthur FC	4–4	Brisbane Roar	Adamson 44', Uskok 51', De Silva 79, Germain 83'; Waddingham 5', 29', Arslanagić 67' (o.g.), Uskok 90+3' (o.g.)	
8	16 March 2025	Newcastle Jets	2–6	Western United	M'Mombwa 65', Thurgate 72' (o.g.); Botic 6', Natta 8' (o.g.), Bozinovski 29', 53', Danzaki 35', Ruhs 85'	

== Biggest winning margin ==
Goals margin	Date	Home team	Result	Away team	Goal Scorers	Ref
8	14 April 2024	Melbourne City	8–0	Perth Glory	Natel 14',28', Arslan 16', 26', 73', Majekodunmi 19' (o.g.), Maclaren 60', Ugarkovic 86' –	
7	28 December 2023	Melbourne City	8–1	Brisbane Roar	Good 10', Maclaren 13', 34', 58', Natel 47', 70', Arslan 75', Mazzeo 85'; Brownlie 62'	
7	21 January 2011	Adelaide United	8–1	North Queensland Fury	Flores 4', 37', 87', T. Dodd 28', Ramsay 42', van Dijk 47', 67', 83'; Nikas 72'	
7	24 January 2015	Adelaide United	7–0	Newcastle Jets	Djite 2', 53', Carrusca 23', 30' (pen), Boogaard 40', Cirio 68', Isaías 90+4' –	
7	17 April 2021	Melbourne City	7–0	Melbourne Victory	Nabbout 11', Maclaren 34' (pen.), 64', 75' (pen.), 84', 85' Luna 87' –	
7	12 March 2024	Melbourne City	7–0	Western Sydney Wanderers	Arslan 30', 32', Natel 39', Caputo 42', Reis 82', Maclaren 77', Antonis 82', –	
6	18 February 2007	Melbourne Victory	6–0	Adelaide United	A. Thompson 20', 29', 39', 56', 72', Sarkies 90+3' –	
6	25 October 2009	Wellington Phoenix	6–0	Gold Coast United	Daniel 28', 53', T. Brown 48', Greenacre 54', Ifill 59', Hearfield 82' –	
6	28 October 2011	Brisbane Roar	7–1	Adelaide United	Henrique 20' (pen), 36 (pen), Berisha 23', 26', 28', 69, Nakajima-Farran 80'; Vidošić 5'	
6	19 January 2013	Sydney FC	7–1	Wellington Phoenix	J. Griffiths 11', Del Piero 21', 23' (pen), 39', 70', Culina 26', Yau 84'; Sigmund 80'	
6	30 December 2017	Sydney FC	6–0	Perth Glory	O'Neill 21', Mierzejewski 58', Brosque 62', Bobô 67' (pen), 90', 90+5' –	
6	14 April 2018	Central Coast Mariners	2–8	Newcastle Jets FC	Pain 39', Buhagiar 80'; Champness 10', O'Donovan 20', 68' (pen), McGree 24', 53', 75', Jackson 60', D. Petratos 81'	
6	9 March 2019	Central Coast Mariners	2–8	Wellington Phoenix	Clisby 61', Mallon 69'; Graham 8' (o.g.), Krishna 12', 45+1', Williams 21', Cacace 51', Singh 57, 88, Fenton 59'	
6	6 March 2021	Melbourne Victory	0–6	Melbourne City	Maclaren 34', Berenguer 52', Griffiths 56', Metcalfe 74', 77', Colakovski 90+3' –	
6	2 April 2022	Wellington Phoenix	0–6	Melbourne City	- Surman 17' (o.g.), Leckie 50', Nabbout 59', Good 68', Tilio 76', 81'	
6	16 April 2022	Perth Glory	0–6	Western United	- Wales 25', 27', 45+3', Pierias 34', Prijović 52' (pen.), Wenzel-Halls 83'	
6	29 October 2023	Adelaide United	6–0	Melbourne City	Irankunda 14', Talbot 29' (o.g.), Tunnicliffe 75', Toure 81', Bernardo 88', 90+4' –	
6	28 April 2024	Sydney FC	7–1	Perth Glory	Courtney-Perkins 5', Lolley 41', 90+1, Brattan 45+2, (pen.), Mak 68', 74', King 81'; Taggart 58'	
