= 2017–18 Melbourne City FC season =

Melbourne City
2017–18 season
- Owner: City Football Group
- Chairman: Khaldoon Al Mubarak
- Manager: Warren Joyce
- Stadium: AAMI Park
- A-League: 3rd
- A-League Finals: Semi-finals
- FFA Cup: Quarter-finals
- Top goalscorer: League: Ross McCormack (14); All: Ross McCormack (14)
- Highest home attendance: 20,787 vs. Melbourne Victory (23 December 2017); A-League
- Lowest home attendance: 5,207 vs. Wellington Phoenix (6 January 2018); A-League
- Average home league attendance: 9,612
- Biggest win: 5–0 vs. Adelaide United (H) (21 January 2018); A-League
- Biggest defeat: 0–4 vs. Sydney FC (H) (10 February 2018); A-League
Home colours	Away colours

The 2017–18 season was the eighth in the history of Melbourne City Football Club. In addition to the domestic league, the club competed in the FFA Cup for the fourth time.

On 19 June 2017, Warren Joyce was appointed manager of the club, Joyce having previously managed the Manchester United Reserves, Royal Antwerp and Wigan Athletic. On 7 November 2017, Joe Montemurro left his position as assistant coach of the club to take up the senior coaching position at Arsenal Women.

== Players ==
Note: Flags indicate national team as defined under FIFA eligibility rules; some limited exceptions apply. Players may hold more than one non-FIFA nationality.

No.	Pos.	Nation	Player
1	GK	AUS	Dean Bouzanis
2	DF	MLT	Manny Muscat
3	DF	AUS	Scott Jamieson
4	DF	AUS	Harrison Delbridge
5	DF	NED	Bart Schenkeveld
6	DF	AUS	Osama Malik
7	FW	AUS	Nick Fitzgerald
8	MF	AUS	Oliver Bozanic
10	MF	AUS	Dario Vidošić
11	MF	AUS	Bruce Kamau
13	MF	AUS	Stefan Mauk (On loan from N.E.C.)
14	FW	AUS	Daniel Arzani
15	MF	AUS	Denis Genreau
18	GK	AUS	Eugene Galekovic

No.	Pos.	Nation	Player
19	DF	AUS	Christian Cavallo
21	DF	AUS	Ruon Tongyik
22	DF	DEN	Michael Jakobsen (captain)
23	FW	URU	Bruno Fornaroli
25	MF	ITA	Iacopo La Rocca
26	MF	AUS	Luke Brattan (on loan from Manchester City)
27	MF	POL	Marcin Budziński
30	FW	AUS	Moudi Najjar (scholarship)
34	MF	AUS	Connor Metcalfe (scholarship)
35	MF	AUS	Ramy Najjarine (scholarship)
36	DF	AUS	Dylan Pierias
37	MF	AUS	Nathaniel Atkinson
42	GK	AUS	James Delianov

== Transfers ==
=== From youth squad ===
N	Pos.	Nat.	Name	Age	Notes
34	MF	(Australia)	Connor Metcalfe	17	1 year scholarship contract
37	MF	(Australia)	Nathaniel Atkinson	18	2 year contract
19	DF	(Australia)	Christian Cavallo	21	6 month contract

=== Transfers in ===
No.	Position	Player	Transferred from	Type/fee	Contract length	Date	Ref
18	GK	Eugene Galekovic	Adelaide United	Free transfer	2 years	16 June 2017	
3	DF	Scott Jamieson	(Sweden) IFK Göteborg	Free transfer	4 years	3 July 2017	
25	DF	(Italy) Iacopo La Rocca	Adelaide United	Free transfer	2 years	15 July 2017	
30	FW	John Roberts	(Australia) FFA Centre of Excellence	Free transfer	2 years	18 July 2017	
35	MF	Ramy Najjarine	Western Sydney Wanderers	Free transfer	3 years	18 July 2017	
13	MF	Stefan Mauk	(Netherlands) N.E.C.	Loan	1 year	26 July 2017	
5	DF	(Netherlands) Bart Schenkeveld	(Netherlands) PEC Zwolle	Transfer	2 years	21 August 2017	
9	MF	(Argentina) Marcelo Carrusca		Free transfer	1 year	12 September 2017	
27	MF	(Poland) Marcin Budziński	(Poland) Cracovia	Free transfer	2 years	18 September 2017	
44	FW	(Scotland) Ross McCormack	(England) Aston Villa	Injury replacement loan		29 September 2017	
4	DF	Harrison Delbridge	(United States) FC Cincinnati	Free transfer	3 years	28 November 2017	
10	MF	Dario Vidošić		Free transfer	1.5 years	29 December 2017	
8	MF	Oliver Bozanic		Free transfer	6 months	10 February 2018	
30	FW	Moudi Najjar	Western Sydney Wanderers	Free transfer	2 years	13 February 2018	

=== Transfers out ===
No.	Position	Player	Transferred to	Type/fee	Date	Ref
9	MF	(Argentina) Nicolás Colazo	(Argentina) Boca Juniors	Loan return	1 May 2017	
3	DF	Joshua Rose	Unattached	End of contract	1 May 2017	
7	FW	Corey Gameiro	Unattached	End of contract	1 May 2017	
28	FW	Steve Kuzmanovski	Unattached	End of contract	1 May 2017	
18	MF	Paulo Retre	Unattached	End of contract	16 June 2017	
5	DF	Ivan Franjic	(South Korea) Daegu FC	Free transfer	19 July 2017	
1	GK	(Denmark) Thomas Sørensen	Retired		25 July 2017	
10	MF	Anthony Cáceres	(England) Manchester City	Loan return	29 July 2017	
17	FW	Tim Cahill		Mutual contract termination	6 December 2017	
10	MF	(Argentina) Fernando Brandán	(Argentina) Temperley	Loan return	18 December 2017	
30	FW	John Roberts	Western Sydney Wanderers	Free transfer	4 January 2018	
9	MF	(Argentina) Marcelo Carrusca	Western Sydney Wanderers	Mutual contract termination	11 January 2018	
8	MF	Neil Kilkenny		Mutual contract termination	23 January 2018	
44	FW	(Scotland) Ross McCormack	(England) Aston Villa	Loan return	25 January 2018	
12	FW	Braedyn Crowley		Mutual contract termination	13 February 2018	

=== Contract extensions ===
No.	Name	Position	Duration	Date	Notes
10	Anthony Cáceres	Central midfielder	1 year	16 June 2017	(Note: Cáceres's loan extension was cancelled by the end of July, after Manchester City accepted a loan deal for him at Emirati club Al-Wasl.)
26	Luke Brattan	Central midfielder	1 year	1 August 2017	(Note: Brattan's loan from Manchester City was extended an additional year from 1 August 2017.)
14	Daniel Arzani	Winger	1 year	30 March 2018	

== Technical staff ==
Position	Name
Head coach	(England) Warren Joyce
Assistant coach	(Australia) Tony Vidmar
Goalkeeping coach	(Australia) Jess Vanstrattan
Head of Sport Science	(England) Edward Leng
Club physio	(Australia) Belinda Pacella
Youth team manager	(Australia) Joe Palatsides
Youth Team Assistant	(Australia) Patrick Kisnorbo

== Pre-season and friendlies ==
Win Draw Loss

18 July 2017	Oakleigh Cannons (Australia)	0–10	Melbourne City	Melbourne
19:30 AEST		Report	Fitzgerald 18', 67'; Fornaroli 28', 35' (pen.), 43', 62', 69'; Brattan 30'; Genreau 66'; Atkinson 90'	Stadium: Jack Edwards Reserve

25 July 2017	Bentleigh Greens (Australia)	0–2	Melbourne City	Melbourne
19:30 AEST		Report	Fitzgerald 86', 90'	Stadium: Kingston Heath Soccer Complex

16 August 2017	Melbourne City	3–2	Central Coast Mariners	Melbourne
	Arzani 11'; Fitzgerald 53'; Fornaroli 61'	Report	Hoole 23', 55'	Stadium: City Football Academy; Attendance: 0 (behind closed doors)
Note: Match was played with one 45-minute period and two 30-minute periods

23 August 2017	Melbourne City	1–3	Newcastle Jets	Melbourne
	Jakobsen 56'	Report	Nabbout 22'; O'Donovan 40'; Champness 42'	Stadium: City Football Academy; Attendance: 0 (behind closed doors)

5 September 2017	Melbourne City	1–2	Adelaide United	Melbourne
	Mauk 60'	Report	Blackwood 70' (pen.); O'Doherty 120'	Stadium: City Football Academy; Attendance: 0 (behind closed doors)
Note: Match was played with three 40-minute periods

22 September 2017	Melbourne City	1–0	Western Sydney Wanderers	Shepparton
19:30 AEST	Arzani 21' (pen.)	Report		Stadium: McEwen Reserve; Attendance: 2,500; Referee: Jonathan Barreiro

29 September 2017	Adelaide United	0–2	Melbourne City	Adelaide
		Report	Fitzgerald 42'; Mauk 55'	Stadium: Coopers Stadium; Attendance: 0 (behind closed doors)

6 February 2018	Melbourne City	1–4	(China) Guangzhou R&F	Melbourne
17:00 AEDT	Fornaroli 15'	Report	Zahavi 25', 71'; Urso 30'; Lu 55'	Stadium: City Football Academy

== Competitions ==
=== Overall record ===
Competition	First match	Last match	Starting round	Final position	Record							
Competition	First match	Last match	Starting round	Final position	Pld	W	D	L	GF	GA	GD	Win %
A-League	6 October 2017	14 April 2018	Matchday 1	3rd	27	13	4	10	41	33	+8	48.15
A-League Finals	20 April 2018	27 April 2018	Elimination-finals	Semi-finals	2	1	0	1	3	2	+1	50.00
FFA Cup	1 August 2017	13 September 2017	Round of 32	Quarter-finals	3	2	0	1	5	4	+1	66.67
Total					32	16	4	12	49	39	+10	50.00

Source: Soccerway

=== A-League ===
==== League table ====
Pos	Team	Pld	W	D	L	GF	GA	GD	Pts	Qualification
1	Sydney FC	27	20	4	3	64	22	+42	64	Qualification for 2019 AFC Champions League group stage and Finals series
2	Newcastle Jets	27	15	5	7	57	37	+20	50	Qualification for 2019 AFC Champions League second preliminary round and Finals series
3	Melbourne City	27	13	4	10	41	33	+8	43	Qualification for Finals series
4	Melbourne Victory (C)	27	12	5	10	43	37	+6	41	Qualification for 2019 AFC Champions League group stage and Finals series
5	Adelaide United	27	11	6	10	36	38	−2	39	Qualification for Finals series
6	Brisbane Roar	27	10	5	12	33	40	−7	35	Qualification for Finals series
7	Western Sydney Wanderers	27	8	9	10	38	47	−9	33	
8	Perth Glory	27	10	2	15	37	50	−13	32	
9	Wellington Phoenix (Note: Wellington Phoenix cannot qualify for the AFC Champions League as they are not recognised as an AFC club.)	27	5	6	16	31	55	−24	21	
10	Central Coast Mariners	27	4	8	15	28	49	−21	20	

Source: A-Leagues
Rules for classification: 1) points; 2) goal difference; 3) number of goals scored.
(C) Champions

==== Results summary ====
Overall								Home						Away					
Pld	W	D	L	GF	GA	GD	Pts	W	D	L	GF	GA	GD	W	D	L	GF	GA	GD
27	13	4	10	41	33	+8	43	7	2	5	20	15	+5	6	2	5	21	18	+3

Source: ultimatealeague.com

==== Results by round ====
Round	1	2	3	4	5	6	7	8	9	10	11	12	13	14	15	16	17	18	19	20	21	22	23	24	25	26	27
Ground	H	A	H	A	H	H	A	H	A	H	A	H	A	H	A	A	H	H	A	H	A	H	A	H	A	H	A
Result	W	W	W	W	L	D	L	L	W	W	L	L	L	W	W	D	W	D	W	L	L	L	D	W	W	W	L
Position	2	1	1	1	2	2	3	3	3	3	3	3	4	3	3	3	3	3	3	3	3	3	4	3	3	3	3
Points	3	6	9	12	12	13	13	13	16	19	19	19	19	22	25	26	29	30	33	33	33	33	34	37	40	43	43

Source: Ultimate A-League
A = Away; H = Home; W = Win; D = Draw; L = Loss

==== Matches ====
6 October 2017 1	Melbourne City	2–0	Brisbane Roar	Melbourne
19:50 AEDT	Kamau 45', 74'	Report		Stadium: AAMI Park; Attendance: 9,589; Referee: Jarred Gillett

14 October 2017 2	Melbourne Victory	1–2	Melbourne City	Melbourne
19:50 AEDT	George 55'	Report	Budziński 45+3'; Kamau 64'	Stadium: Etihad Stadium; Attendance: 35,792; Referee: Peter Green

21 October 2017 3	Melbourne City	1–0	Wellington Phoenix	Melbourne
17:35 AEDT	McCormack 69'	Report		Stadium: AAMI Park; Attendance: 9,091; Referee: Jonathan Barreiro

28 October 2017 4	Adelaide United	0–2	Melbourne City	Adelaide
19:20 ACDT		Report	McCormack 11' (pen.), 16'	Stadium: Coopers Stadium; Attendance: 11,689; Referee: Kurt Ams

3 November 2017 5	Melbourne City	0–1	Sydney FC	Melbourne
19:50 AEDT		Report	Wilkshire 59'	Stadium: AAMI Park; Attendance: 11,034; Referee: Jarred Gillett

12 November 2017 6	Melbourne City	1–1	Western Sydney Wanderers	Melbourne
19:00 AEDT	McCormack 55' (pen.)	Report	Sotirio 19'	Stadium: AAMI Park; Attendance: 7,516; Referee: Jonathan Barreiro

17 November 2017 7	Brisbane Roar	3–1	Melbourne City	Brisbane
18:50 AEST	Papadopoulos 5', 70'; Bauthéac 43'	Report	Mauk 54'	Stadium: Suncorp Stadium; Attendance: 9,285; Referee: Chris Beath

24 November 2017 8	Melbourne City	1–3	Perth Glory	Melbourne
19:50 AEDT	McCormack 31'	Report	Nichols 12'; Torres 43' (pen.); Mallia 83'	Stadium: AAMI Park; Attendance: 6,963; Referee: Daniel Elder

2 December 2017 9	Newcastle Jets	1–2	Melbourne City	Newcastle
19:50 AEDT	Nabbout 32'	Report	McCormack 40' (pen.); Muscat 86'	Stadium: McDonald Jones Stadium; Attendance: 8,108; Referee: Shaun Evans

10 December 2017 10	Melbourne City	1–0	Central Coast Mariners	Melbourne
19:00 AEDT	McCormack 59'	Report		Stadium: AAMI Park; Attendance: 7,170; Referee: Jarred Gillett

15 December 2017 11	Sydney FC	3–1	Melbourne City	Sydney
19:50 AEDT	Mierzejewski 44'; Bobô 45+3' (pen.); Brosque 90+6'	Report	Brattan 36'	Stadium: Allianz Stadium; Attendance: 10,688; Referee: Shaun Evans

23 December 2017 12	Melbourne City	0–1	Melbourne Victory	Melbourne
19:50 AEDT		Report	Milligan 90+5' (pen.)	Stadium: AAMI Park; Attendance: 20,787; Referee: Jarred Gillett

1 January 2018 13	Western Sydney Wanderers	2–1	Melbourne City	Sydney
19:50 AEDT	Riera 30'; Bridge 32'	Report	McCormack 25'	Stadium: ANZ Stadium; Attendance: 11,628; Referee: Peter Green

6 January 2018 14	Melbourne City	2–1	Wellington Phoenix	Melbourne
19:50 AEDT	McCormack 72', 80'	Report	Krishna 42'	Stadium: AAMI Park; Attendance: 5,207; Referee: Adam Kersey

9 January 2018 15	Perth Glory	0–2	Melbourne City	Perth
19:00 AWST		Report	McCormack 9', 38' (pen.)	Stadium: nib Stadium; Attendance: 8,016; Referee: Jarred Gillett

14 January 2018 16	Central Coast Mariners	2–2	Melbourne City	Gosford
17:00 AEDT	Baró 13'; McGing 50'	Report	McCormack 42'; Budziński 86'	Stadium: Central Coast Stadium; Attendance: 6,263; Referee: Adam Kersey

21 January 2018 17	Melbourne City	5–0	Adelaide United	Melbourne
19:00 AEDT	Budziński 30', 35'; Vidošić 89', 90+2'; McCormack 90+6'	Report		Stadium: AAMI Park; Attendance: 8,103; Referee: Adam Fielding

25 January 2018 18	Melbourne City	2–2	Newcastle Jets	Melbourne
19:50 AEDT	Arzani 43' (pen.); Vidošić 82'	Report	Topor-Stanley 3'; Hoffman 70'	Stadium: AAMI Park; Attendance: 7,790; Referee: Kurt Ams

4 February 2018 19	Brisbane Roar	1–2	Melbourne City	Brisbane
18:00 AEST	Maccarone 14'	Report	Budziński 19'; Mauk 66'	Stadium: Suncorp Stadium; Attendance: 9,150; Referee: Jonathan Barreiro

10 February 2018 20	Melbourne City	0–4	Sydney FC	Melbourne
19:50 AEDT		Report	Bobô 32' (pen.), 65'; Ninkovic 43'; Mierzejewski 79'	Stadium: AAMI Park; Attendance: 8,587; Referee: Kurt Ams

24 February 2018 21	Perth Glory	2–1	Melbourne City	Perth
19:00 AWST	Kilkenny 85'; Taggart 90+7'	Report	Arzani 44'	Stadium: nib Stadium; Attendance: 8,029; Referee: Shaun Evans

2 March 2018 22	Melbourne City	1–2	Melbourne Victory	Melbourne
19:50 AEDT	Fornaroli 54' (pen.)	Report	Barbarouses 12'; George 62'	Stadium: AAMI Park; Attendance: 20,083; Referee: Kris Griffiths-Jones

16 March 2018 23	Adelaide United	1–1	Melbourne City	Adelaide
19:20 ACDT	Absalonsen 45+1'	Report	Mauk 53'	Stadium: Coopers Stadium; Attendance: 7,668; Referee: Chris Beath

24 March 2018 24	Melbourne City	3–0	Western Sydney Wanderers	Melbourne
19:50 AEDT	Fornaroli 42'; Jakobsen 57'; Mauk 67'	Report		Stadium: AAMI Park; Attendance: 6,354; Referee: Jarred Gillett

1 April 2018 25	Newcastle Jets	0–3	Melbourne City	Newcastle
17:00 AEST		Report	Fornaroli 42'; Vidošić 53', 77'	Stadium: McDonald Jones Stadium; Attendance: 11,423; Referee: Jarred Gillett

7 April 2018 26	Melbourne City	1–0	Central Coast Mariners	Melbourne
19:50 AEST	Fornaroli 49'	Report		Stadium: AAMI Park; Attendance: 8,156; Referee: Alex King

14 April 2018 27	Wellington Phoenix	2–1	Melbourne City	Auckland
19:35 NZST	Singh 33', 58'	Report	Fornaroli 20'	Stadium: QBE Stadium; Attendance: 4,312; Referee: Shaun Evans

==== Finals series ====
20 April 2018 Elimination-finals	Melbourne City	2–0	Brisbane Roar	Melbourne
19:50 AEST	Mauk 59'; Fitzgerald 90+1'	Report		Stadium: AAMI Park; Attendance: 7,757; Referee: Jarred Gillett

27 April 2018 Semi-finals	Newcastle Jets	2–1	Melbourne City	Newcastle
19:50 AEST	McGree 56'; Hoffman 74'	Report	Topor-Stanley 14' (o.g.)	Stadium: McDonald Jones Stadium; Attendance: 19,131; Referee: Shaun Evans

=== FFA Cup ===
1 August 2017 Round of 32	Peninsula Power (Queensland)	0–2	Melbourne City	Brisbane
19:30 AEST		Report	Mauk 45+1'; Fornaroli 90+1'	Stadium: Dolphin Stadium; Attendance: 4,017; Referee: Lara Lee

29 August 2017 Round of 16	Hakoah Sydney City East (New South Wales)	2–3	Melbourne City	Sydney
19:30 AEST	De Jong 10'; Green 90+2'	Report	Jakobsen 8'; Fitzgerald 13'; Genreau 62'	Stadium: Leichhardt Oval; Attendance: 2,915; Referee: Adrian Arndt

13 September 2017 Quarter-finals	Sydney FC	2–0	Melbourne City	Sydney
19:30 AEST	Buijs 7'; Brosque 51'	Report		Stadium: Leichhardt Oval; Attendance: 4,102; Referee: Kris Griffiths-Jones

== Statistics ==
=== Appearances and goals ===
Includes all competitions. Players with no appearances not included in the list.

No.	Pos.	Nat.	Name	A-League		FFA Cup		Total	
No.	Pos.	Nat.	Name	Apps	Goals	Apps	Goals	Apps	Goals
1	GK	(Australia)	Dean Bouzanis	21	0	2	0	23	0
2	DF	(Malta)	Manny Muscat	13(10)	1	3	0	26	1
3	DF	(Australia)	Scott Jamieson	27(1)	0	3	0	31	0
4	DF	(Australia)	Harrison Delbridge	5(7)	0	0	0	12	0
5	DF	(Netherlands)	Bart Schenkeveld	27	0	2	0	29	0
6	MF	(Australia)	Osama Malik	20	0	2	0	22	0
7	FW	(Australia)	Nick Fitzgerald	16(11)	1	3	1	30	2
8	MF	(Australia)	Oliver Bozanic	9	0	0	0	9	0
10	MF	(Australia)	Dario Vidošić	16	5	0	0	16	5
11	FW	(Australia)	Bruce Kamau	11(5)	3	2	0	18	3
13	MF	(Australia)	Stefan Mauk	22(1)	5	3	1	26	6
14	FW	(Australia)	Daniel Arzani	15(3)	2	1(1)	0	20	2
15	MF	(Australia)	Denis Genreau	0(1)	0	0(1)	1	2	1
18	GK	(Australia)	Eugene Galekovic	8	0	1	0	9	0
21	DF	(Australia)	Ruon Tongyik	0	0	1(1)	0	2	0
22	DF	(Denmark)	Michael Jakobsen	26	1	3	1	29	2
23	FW	(Uruguay)	Bruno Fornaroli	8(2)	5	2	1	12	6
25	DF	(Italy)	Iacopo La Rocca	12	0	1	0	13	0
26	MF	(Australia)	Luke Brattan	24(3)	1	0	0	27	1
27	MF	(Poland)	Marcin Budziński	8(9)	5	0	0	17	5
34	MF	(Australia)	Connor Metcalfe	0(1)	0	0	0	1	0
37	DF	(Australia)	Nathaniel Atkinson	16(1)	0	0(1)	0	18	0
Player(s) transferred out but featured this season
8	MF	(Australia)	Neil Kilkenny	0(3)	0	3	0	6	0
9	MF	(Argentina)	Marcelo Carrusca	0(3)	0	0(1)	0	4	0
12	FW	(Australia)	Braedyn Crowley	0(3)	0	0(1)	0	4	0
17	FW	(Australia)	Tim Cahill	1(5)	0	0(1)	0	7	0
44	FW	(Scotland)	Ross McCormack	14(3)	14	0	0	17	14

=== Disciplinary record ===
Includes all competitions. The list is sorted by squad number when total cards are equal. Players with no cards not included in the list.

Rank	No.	Pos.	Nat.	Name	A-League			FFA Cup			Total		
Rank	No.	Pos.	Nat.	Name	Yellow card	Second yellow card	Red card	Yellow card	Second yellow card	Red card	Yellow card	Second yellow card	Red card
1	6	MF	(Australia)	Osama Malik	2	1	1	0	0	0	2	1	1
2	2	DF	(Malta)	Manny Muscat	7	0	1	0	0	0	7	0	1
3	4	DF	(Australia)	Harrison Delbridge	1	0	1	0	0	0	1	0	1
4	5	DF	(Netherlands)	Bart Schenkeveld	8	1	0	0	0	0	8	1	0
5	26	MF	(Australia)	Luke Brattan	6	0	0	0	0	0	6	0	0
6	14	FW	(Australia)	Daniel Arzani	5	0	0	0	0	0	5	0	0
7	22	DF	(Denmark)	Michael Jakobsen	4	0	0	0	0	0	4	0	0
8	25	DF	(Italy)	Iacopo La Rocca	2	0	0	1	0	0	3	0	0
9	3	DF	(Australia)	Scott Jamieson	2	0	0	0	0	0	2	0	0
9	7	FW	(Australia)	Nick Fitzgerald	2	0	0	0	0	0	2	0	0
9	11	FW	(Australia)	Bruce Kamau	2	0	0	0	0	0	2	0	0
9	13	MF	(Australia)	Stefan Mauk	2	0	0	0	0	0	2	0	0
9	23	FW	(Uruguay)	Bruno Fornaroli	2	0	0	0	0	0	2	0	0
9	27	MF	(Poland)	Marcin Budziński	2	0	0	0	0	0	2	0	0
9	37	DF	(Australia)	Nathaniel Atkinson	2	0	0	0	0	0	2	0	0
9	44	FW	(Scotland)	Ross McCormack	2	0	0	0	0	0	2	0	0
17	1	GK	(Australia)	Dean Bouzanis	1	0	0	0	0	0	1	0	0
17	8	MF	(Australia)	Neil Kilkenny	0	0	0	1	0	0	1	0	0
17	10	MF	(Australia)	Dario Vidošić	1	0	0	0	0	0	1	0	0

=== Clean sheets ===
Includes all competitions. The list is sorted by squad number when total clean sheets are equal. Players with no clean sheets not included in the list.

Rank	No.	Nat.	Name	A-League	FFA Cup	Total
1	1	(Australia)	Dean Bouzanis	7	1	8
2	18	(Australia)	Eugene Galekovic	3	0	3
Total				10	1	11

== See also ==
- 2017–18 Melbourne City FC (women) season
