= Luke Brattan =

Australian soccer player (born 1990)

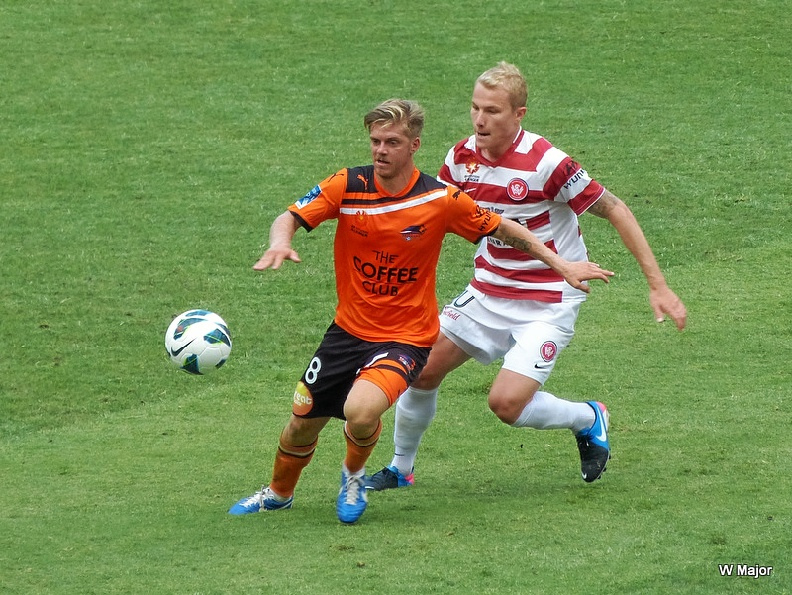
- Brattan (left) and Aaron Mooy in an A-League match in 2013

Personal information
- Full name: Nathan Luke Brattan
- Date of birth: 8 March 1990 (age 36)
- Place of birth: Hull, England
- Height: 1.75 m (5 ft 9 in)
- Position: Defensive midfielder

Team information
- Current team: Sydney Olympic

Youth career
- Rochedale Rovers
- –2008: Queensland Lions
- 2008–2010: Brisbane Roar

Senior career*
Years	Team	Apps	(Gls)
2009–2015	Brisbane Roar	91	(4)
2015–2019	Manchester City	0	(0)
2015	→ Bolton Wanderers (loan)	0	(0)
2016–2019	→ Melbourne City (loan)	79	(6)
2019–2024	Sydney FC	108	(2)
2024–2026	Macarthur FC	40	(3)
2026–	Sydney Olympic	1	(0)

International career^{‡}
2008–2009	Australia U-20	8	(1)
2024	Australia	1	(0)
- * Club domestic league appearances and goals as of 19 October 2026 ‡ National team caps and goals as of 15 October 2024

Nathan Luke Brattan (born 8 March 1990) is an Australian professional soccer player who plays as a defensive midfielder for Sydney Olympic in the Australian Championship.

Born in England, Brattan moved to Australia at a young age, playing youth football for Rochedale Rovers and Queensland Lions before making his professional debut for Brisbane Roar. He spent several seasons with the Roar before leaving the club in 2015. He subsequently signed for Manchester City, spending the majority of his subsequent time on loan at partner club Melbourne City.

Brattan appeared several times for the Australian under-20 side and has been called up to the squad of the Australian senior side.

== Early life ==
Brattan was born in Hull, England, but moved to Australia when he was six months old. His father Gary formerly played for Hull City.

== Club career ==
=== Brisbane Roar ===
Brattan made his senior debut as a 19-year-old in the Queensland Roar's "Against Racism" clash against the Scottish football side Celtic in 2009, displaying early potential. His debut A-League appearance was away to Perth Glory in December 2009. Often described as one of the best passers of the ball at the club, Brattan finally nailed down a regular spot in the Brisbane Roar starting side after two seasons hampered by injury. He scored the winning goal against Melbourne Victory on 22 March 2014 to award Brisbane the Premiers Plate. In the 2013–14 season Brattan capped a great year by being named in the 2013–14 PFA A-League Team of the Season.

Brattan was released by the club in the run up to the 2015–16 A-League season following disputes over unpaid superannuation.

=== Manchester City ===
Following his release from Brisbane Roar, Brattan was linked with a move to English Premier League side Manchester City. On 26 October 2015, Brattan completed the free transfer move to Manchester City on a four-year deal.

==== Bolton Wanderers loan ====
On the same day of signing for Manchester City, he was immediately sent out on loan to Bolton Wanderers in the Championship until 3 January 2016. However, the loan was cut short by two weeks and Brattan was recalled by his parent club without having played a single game for Bolton Wanderers.

==== Melbourne City loan ====
In June 2016, Brattan joined Melbourne City on a one-year loan deal. He made his first appearance in a City shirt in a 5–0 friendly match win over Port Melbourne SC on 20 July 2016. On 1 August 2017, Melbourne City announced that Brattan's loan deal at the club had been extended for an additional year. On 5 July the club confirmed Brattan's loan would be extended by a third season.

On 7 August 2018, during the first half of the First Round match of 2018 FFA Cup against Brisbane Roar Brattan fell to the ground in a challenge with Stefan Mauk and was accidentally kicked in the head by the opposition player as Mauk kicked the ball away. When the club doctor suspected he had suffered a spinal injury, the game was suspended for 40 minutes as they awaited a specialist ambulance designed for transporting patients with head, neck or spine injuries. He was transported to Redcliffe Hospital.

=== Sydney FC ===
In July 2019, Brattan joined Sydney FC on a one-year contract. He scored his first goal for the club on 2 January 2021 against Wellington Phoenix.

On 8 August 2023, Sydney FC announced Brattan as the new club captain, replacing Alex Wilkinson who retired at the conclusion of the 2022–23 season.

=== Macarthur FC ===
Brattan moved to Sydney's cross-town rivals, Macarthur FC, for the 2024–25 season.

=== Sydney Olympic ===
On September 14 2026, Brattan signed with Sydney Olympic for their Australian Championship campaign.

== International career ==
Brattan played in Australia's under-20 squad in 2008 and 2009.

Ahead of a 2018 FIFA World Cup Qualification match against Bangladesh in Perth, Ange Postecoglou called up Brattan for the senior Australian team as an injury replacement for captain Mile Jedinak.

On 6 October 2024, Socceroos coach Tony Popovic recalled Brattan to the squad to cover injured midfielders Massimo Luongo and Connor Metcalfe.

== Career statistics ==
As of 25 April 2026

Appearances and goals by club, season and competition
Club	Season	League			Cup		Continental		Total	
Club	Season	Division	Apps	Goals	Apps	Goals	Apps	Goals	Apps	Goals
Brisbane Roar	2009–10	A-League	1	0	0	0	—		1	0
Brisbane Roar	2010–11	A-League	6	0	0	0	—		6	0
Brisbane Roar	2011–12	A-League	15	0	0	0	5	0	20	0
Brisbane Roar	2012–13	A-League	17	1	0	0	1	0	18	1
Brisbane Roar	2013–14	A-League	28	3	0	0	—		28	3
Brisbane Roar	2014–15	A-League	24	0	1	0	6	0	31	0
Brisbane Roar	2015–16	A-League	0	0	1	0	0	0	1	0
Brisbane Roar	Total		91	4	2	0	12	0	105	4
Manchester City	2015–16	Premier League	0	0	0	0	0	0	0	0
Bolton Wanderers (loan)	2015–16	Championship	0	0	0	0	—		0	0
Melbourne City (loan)	2016–17	A-League	26	1	5	1	—		31	2
Melbourne City (loan)	2017–18	A-League	27	1	3	0	—		30	1
Melbourne City (loan)	2018–19	A-League	26	4	3	0	—		29	4
Melbourne City (loan)	Total		79	6	11	1	0	0	90	7
Sydney FC	2019–20	A-League	26	0	1	0	4	1	31	1
Sydney FC	2020–21	A-League	26	1	0	0	—		26	1
Sydney FC	2021–22	A-League	0	0	1	0	0	0	1	0
Sydney FC	2022–23	A-League	27	0	0	0	—		27	0
Sydney FC	2023–24	A-League	29	1	5	0	—		34	1
Sydney FC	Total		108	2	7	0	4	1	119	3
Macarthur	2024–25	A-League Men	26	2	5	1	—		31	3
Macarthur	2025–26	A-League Men	23	2	3	0	7	0	33	2
Macarthur	Total		49	4	8	1	7	0	64	5
Career total			327	16	28	2	23	1	378	19

== Honours ==
Brisbane Roar

- A-League Premiership: 2010–11, 2013–14
- A-League Championship: 2010–11, 2011–12, 2013–14

Melbourne City

- FFA Cup: 2016

Sydney

- A-League Premiership: 2019–20
- A-League Championship: 2019–20
- Australia Cup: 2023

Macarthur FC

- Australia Cup: 2024

Individual

- PFA A-League Team of the Season: 2013–14, 2017–18, 2019–20, 2020–21
- Sydney FC Player of the Season: 2019–20
- A-Leagues All Star: 2024
