= Fernando Brandán (footballer, born 1990) =

Argentine footballer

Personal information
- Full name: Fernando Daniel Brandán
- Date of birth: 27 March 1990 (age 36)
- Place of birth: Salta, Argentina
- Height: 1.68 m (5 ft 6 in)
- Position: Winger

Team information
- Current team: Temperley

Senior career*
Years	Team	Apps	(Gls)
2012	Racing de Olavarría	19	(1)
2012–2013	Rivadavia	31	(8)
2013–2018	Temperley	87	(15)
2016–2017	Melbourne City	19	(3)
2018–2019	San Martín SJ	7	(0)
2019–2020	San Martín T.	8	(0)
2020	Villa Dálmine	3	(0)
2020–2021	Lija Athletic	21	(7)
2021	Sirens FC	11	(2)
2022–2023	All Boys	34	(9)
2023–2024	Gimnasia Jujuy	32	(7)
2024–2025	Chacarita Juniors	28	(3)
2025–	Temperley	38	(8)
- * Club domestic league appearances and goals as of 17:51, 20 April 2026 (UTC)

Fernando Daniel Brandán (born 27 March 1990) is an Argentine professional footballer who plays as a winger for Temperley.

== Career ==
Brandán joined Melbourne City in July 2016, after having previously played for Racing de Olavarría, Club Rivadavia and Club Atlético Temperley. Brandán made his unofficial City debut in a 4–0 pre-season victory over NPL Victoria side Melbourne Knights FC. Brandán ruptured his ACL during training for the 2017-18 season and did not appear for the team. On 18 December 2017, it was announced that Melbourne City and Brandán had parted ways with Brandán returning to Atlético Temperley. At the end of the 2017/2018 season, after Atlético Temperley was relegated to Liga B Nacional, Brandan moved to Club Atlético San Martín.

== Honours ==
Melbourne City

- FFA Cup: 2016
