= Michael Jakobsen =

Danish footballer (born 1986)

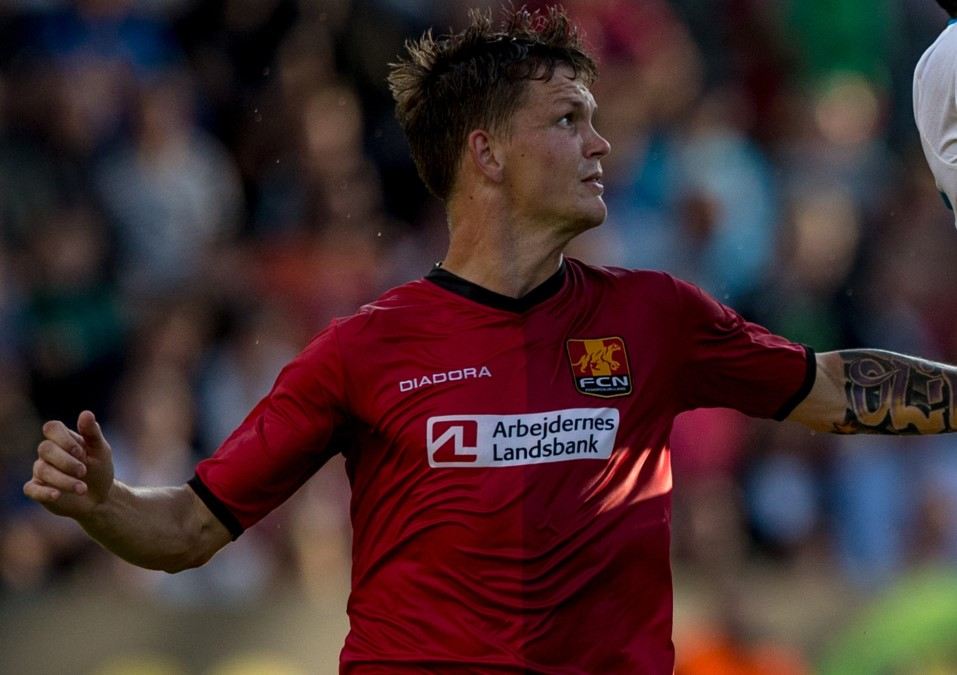
- Jakobsen with Nordsjælland in 2013

Personal information
- Full name: Michael Jakobsen
- Date of birth: 2 January 1986 (age 40)
- Place of birth: Copenhagen, Denmark
- Height: 1.85 m (6 ft 1 in)
- Positions: Centre-back; defensive midfielder

Team information
- Current team: FK Beograd

Youth career
- B 1908
- B.93

Senior career*
Years	Team	Apps	(Gls)
2002–2003	B.93		
2003–2005	PSV	1	(0)
2005–2010	AaB	153	(13)
2010–2011	→ Almería (loan)	5	(0)
2011–2012	Almería	49	(1)
2012–2013	FC Copenhagen	7	(0)
2013	→ FC Nordsjælland (loan)	13	(0)
2014–2016	Esbjerg fB	58	(1)
2016	→ Lillestrøm SK (loan)	10	(0)
2016–2018	Melbourne City	41	(1)
2018–2022	Adelaide United	85	(1)
2022	NorthEast United	10	(0)
2023	Adelaide Olympic	17	(1)
2024–	FK Beograd	10	(2)

International career
2001	Denmark U-16	3	(0)
2001–2003	Denmark U-17	23	(4)
2003–2005	Denmark U-19	13	(2)
2006	Denmark U-20	2	(0)
2005–2008	Denmark U-21	31	(4)
2009	Denmark	5	(0)
- * Club domestic league appearances and goals as of 18 September 2024

Michael Jakobsen (born 2 January 1986) is a Danish professional footballer who plays as a defender for National Premier Leagues South Australia club FK Beograd. He was named 2002 Danish Under-17 Player of the Year, and has played five games for the Denmark national team.

== Club career ==
=== B.93 and PSV ===
Jakobsen started playing football with Boldklubben 1908 and Boldklubben af 1893 in the Danish 1st Division. He made his senior debut for B.93, and after a year at the club, Dutch team PSV Eindhoven spotted Jakobsen and signed him into their youth academy in 2003. Jakobsen would appear in just one first team match for PSV, playing for 10 minutes.

=== Aalborg BK ===
Jakobsen left PSV in February 2005, and returned to Denmark. He signed a contract with Aalborg BK, playing the second half of the 2004–05 Danish Superliga season. Jakobsen made his debut on 13 March 2005, in a 1–1 draw against Brøndby. He proved himself a solid defender with good passing, and played all remaining 15 Superliga games for AaB. After nine months at AaB, he signed a much-improved contract, running until December 2009.

In the 2006–07 Danish Superliga season, Jakobsen played 32 of 33 games, as AaB placed third in the league, their best result in eight years. During the 2006–07 season, Jakobsen scored the first brace of his career in a 4–0 win over Vejle Boldklub on 30 July 2006. The following 2007–08 Danish Superliga season, he played a vital part in the AaB squad that ended up champions, finishing nine points clear of FC Midtjylland.

Jacobsen's performances for AaB in the 2007–08 UEFA Champions League campaign, including a goal in the 2–2 draw with Manchester United, brought him to the attention of several clubs from both the Premier League and Bundesliga, but in December 2008, he chose to extend his AaB contract until June 2012.

=== UD Almería ===
In July 2010, it was announced that La Liga club UD Almería bought Jakobsen from Aalborg BK, with Jacobsen signing a 5-year deal. However, in August 2010, Aalborg BK CEO Poul Sørensen announced that the deal was actually a one-year loan with an option to buy once the loan period had ended. Jakobsen made his Almería debut in a 0–0 draw against Osasuna in the opening game of the season on 29 August 2010. After another appearance against Espanyol, Jakobsen didn't feature in another La Liga game for two months. He would, after his return to the first team, feature more regularly in the squad. On 1 May 2011, Jakobsen received a straight red card in a 1–1 draw against Sevilla Almería was relegated to the Segunda División in 2010–11, after four years in La Liga. Almería would exercise their option to buy Jakobsen from Aalborg BK following the season meaning he would remain in Spain for the upcoming year. In the 2011–12 season, Jakobsen was increasingly used in the first team, but Almerîa were unable to earn promotion to La Liga. On 10 September 2011, Jakobsen scored the first goal of his Spanish career in a 2–0 win over Real Murcia.

=== FC Copenhagen ===
In August 2012, Almería announced that Jakobsen would transfer to Copenhagen after he passed medical tests in Copenhagen. On 25 August 2012, Jakobsen made his debut, playing as a centre back, in a 3–2 win over Randers.

=== Esbjerg fB ===
After a brief loan at FC Nordsjælland while with FC Copenhagen, Jakobsen was signed by another Danish top-flight club, Esbjerg fB, in 2014. Jakobsen would go on to play over 50 senior matches for Esbjerg FC, although he would go out on loan to Norwegian club Lillestrøm SK in early 2016.

=== Melbourne City ===
In September 2016, Jakobsen was signed by A-League club Melbourne City. He joined the club as a designated visa player.

Jakobsen scored his first goal for Melbourne City on his debut, a bicycle kick in the second minute of the 2016 FFA Cup quarter final against Western Sydney Wanderers. He was appointed the club's on-field captain ahead of the 2017/18 season.

=== Adelaide United ===
On 14 May 2018, Jakobsen was released by Melbourne City and he signed a 2-year deal with Adelaide United.

=== NorthEast United ===
On 8 September 2022, he signed for Indian Super League side NorthEast United.

He was named as captain of NorthEast United for the 2022–23 Indian Super League season. On 8 October 2022, he made his debut for the club in their controversial 1–0 away defeat to Bengaluru.

=== Adelaide Olympic ===
Jakobsen signed ahead of the 2023 National Premier Leagues South Australia season with Adelaide Olympic.

== International career ==
While at B 93, Jakobsen played a number of games for various Danish youth national teams, winning the 2002 Danish Under-17 Player of the Year award. He played a combined total of 72 youth national team matches, scoring 10 goals, for the Danish youth selections until October 2008.

While at PSV, he was dropped from the Danish under-19 football team in May 2004. After his move to AaB, he was once more called up for the Danish national youth teams, and made his debut for the Danish under-21 national team in June 2005. In May 2006, he was selected for the Denmark under-21 national team to compete at the 2006 European Under-21 Championship. He played in Denmark's three matches, before they were eliminated from the tournament.

In March 2009, Jakobsen made his debut for the senior Denmark national football team.

== Honours ==
Melbourne City

- FFA Cup: 2016

Adelaide United

- FFA Cup: 2018 and 2019

Individual

- 2002 Danish Under-17 Player of the Year
- Danish Superliga: 2007–08 and 2012–13
