= Nicolás Colazo =

Argentine footballer

Personal information
- Full name: Nicolás Carlos Colazo
- Date of birth: 8 July 1990 (age 36)
- Place of birth: Buenos Aires, Argentina
- Height: 1.75 m (5 ft 9 in)
- Position: Winger

Team information
- Current team: Quilmes

Youth career
- Boca Juniors

Senior career*
Years	Team	Apps	(Gls)
2008–2019	Boca Juniors	105	(7)
2013	→ All Boys (loan)	19	(1)
2016–2017	→ Melbourne City (loan)	22	(4)
2017–2018	→ Gimnasia LP (loan)	25	(6)
2018–2019	→ Aris (loan)	10	(0)
2019	→ Tigre (loan)	4	(0)
2019–2020	Rosario Central	9	(0)
2020–2021	Rentistas	18	(1)
2021–2025	Gimnasia LP	86	(4)
2025–2026	Banfield	6	(0)
2026–	Quilmes	8	(0)
- * Club domestic league appearances and goals as of 17:58, 3 October 2026 (UTC)

Nicolás Carlos Colazo (born 8 July 1990 in Buenos Aires), is an Argentine professional footballer who plays as a winger for Quilmes.

== Club career ==
=== Boca Juniors ===
At age 9 Colazo joined Boca Juniors, where he played at every youth level. His debut for the first team came on July 4, 2009, against Colón, in a 3–1 Boca victory. His first senior goal came in January 2010, a header in a friendly match against San Lorenzo in Mar del Plata. He scored a goal in the Superclásico against River Plate in January 2011. After the arrival of Julio César Falcioni as head coach for the 2011 Torneo Clausura, Colazo earned a starting role in the Boca squad for the first time.

==== Loans ====
In 2013, he was sent on loan to All Boys. Colazo scored one goal for the club, coming in a 1–0 victory over Estudiantes de la Plata in the Copa Argentina quarterfinals.

On 20 September 2016, Colazo joined Melbourne City on a one-year loan deal as the club's second marquee signing. Colazo assisted a Bruno Fornaroli goal on his debut, as City picked up a 4–1 win in the Melbourne Derby against Melbourne Victory FC. Colazo returned to Boca Juniors after Melbourne City lost their elimination-final against Perth Glory.

On 5 July 2018, Colazo joined Super League Greece side Aris on a one-year loan deal. On 24 January 2019, he left Aris and joined Tigre on a 6-month loan deal. The 28-year-old player scored six goals at 25 championship performances with the shirt of Club de Gimnasia y Esgrima La Plata during 2017–18 season, on loan from Boca Juniors.

== Honours ==
Boca Juniors

- Primera División: 2011, 2015
- Copa Argentina: 2011–12, 2014–15

Melbourne City

- FFA Cup: 2016
