= 2016 FFA Cup =

2016 season of Australia's national knockout soccer competition

Tournament details
- Country: Australia; New Zealand
- Dates: 12 February – 30 November 2016
- Teams: 704

Final positions
- Champions: Melbourne City (1st title)
- Runners-up: Sydney FC

Tournament statistics
- Matches played: 31
- Goals scored: 94 (3.03 per match)
- Attendance: 105,574 (3,406 per match)
- Top goal scorer: Patrick Antelmi (5 goals)

The 2016 FFA Cup was the third season of the FFA Cup (now known as the Australia Cup), the main national soccer knockout cup competition in Australia. 32 teams again took part in the competition proper (from the round of 32), including the 10 A-League teams and 21 Football Federation Australia (FFA) member federation teams determined through individual state qualifying rounds, as well as the reigning National Premier Leagues Champion (Blacktown City from NSW).

The winner of the FFA Cup, Melbourne City, received $50,000 as part of a total prize money pool of $131,000. The defending champions, Melbourne Victory, were knocked out in the semi-final stage of the competition by the eventual champions.

== Round and dates ==
Round	Draw date	Match date	Number of fixtures	Teams	New entries this round
Preliminary rounds	Various	12 February–25 June 2016	672 + 56 byes	704 → 32	693
Round of 32	30 June 2016	27 July–10 August 2016	16	32 → 16	11
Round of 16	10 August 2016	24–30 August 2016	8	16 → 8	none
Quarter-finals	30 August 2016	21–27 September 2016	4	8 → 4	none
Semi-finals	27 September 2016	19–25 October 2016	2	4 → 2	none
Final	25 October 2016	30 November 2016	1	2 → 1	none

== Prize fund ==
The prize fund was unchanged from the 2015 event.

Round	No. of Clubs receive fund	Prize fund
Round of 16	8	$2,000
Quarter-finalists	4	$5,000
Semi-finalists	2	$10,000
Final runners-up	1	$25,000
Final winner	1	$50,000
Total		$131,000

In addition, a further $2,500 was donated from sponsor NAB to Member Federation clubs for each goal scored by them against an A-League opposition. Clubs to receive donations were: Green Gully ($5,000), Redlands United ($5,000), Brisbane Strikers ($2,500), Edgeworth FC ($2,500) and Floreat Athena ($2,500).

== Preliminary rounds ==
FFA member federations teams competed in various state-based preliminary rounds to win one of 21 places in the competition proper (round of 32). All Australian clubs (other than youth teams associated with A-League franchises) were eligible to enter the qualifying process through their respective FFA member federation, however only one team per club was permitted entry in the competition. All nine FFA member federations participated.

Federation	Competition	Round of 32 Qualifier
Australian Capital Territory	Federation Cup	1
New South Wales	Waratah Cup	5
Northern New South Wales	—	2
Northern Territory	Sport Minister's Cup	1
Queensland	Canale Cup / Football Queensland Cup	4
South Australia	Federation Cup	1
Tasmania	Milan Lakoseljac Cup	1
Victoria	Dockerty Cup	4
Western Australia	State Cup	2

The preliminary rounds operated within a consistent national structure whereby club entry into the competition is staggered in each state/territory, ultimately leading to round 7 with the winning clubs from that round gaining direct entry into the round of 32. The first matches of the preliminary rounds began in February 2016, and the final matches of the preliminary rounds in June 2016.

== Teams ==
A total of 32 teams participated in the 2016 FFA Cup competition proper, ten of which came from the A-League, one the 2015 National Premier Leagues Champion (Blacktown City), and the remaining 21 teams from FFA member federations, as determined by the qualifying rounds. A-League clubs represent the highest level in the Australian league system, whereas member federation clubs come from Level 2 and below. The current season tier of member federation clubs is shown in parentheses.

A-League clubs
Adelaide United	Brisbane Roar	Central Coast Mariners	Melbourne City
Melbourne Victory	Newcastle Jets	Perth Glory	Sydney FC
Wellington Phoenix	Western Sydney Wanderers		
Member federation clubs
(Australian Capital Territory) Canberra Olympic (2)	(New South Wales) Blacktown City (2)	(New South Wales) Bonnyrigg White Eagles (2)	(New South Wales) Manly United (2)
(New South Wales) Marconi Stallions (3)	(New South Wales) Sydney United 58 (2)	(New South Wales) Wollongong Wolves (2)	(New South Wales) Edgeworth FC (2)
(New South Wales) Lambton Jaffas (2)	(Northern Territory) Shamrock Rovers Darwin (2)	(Queensland) Brisbane Strikers (2)	Far North Queensland (2)
(Queensland) Redlands United (2)	(Queensland) Surfers Paradise Apollo (3)	(South Australia) North Eastern MetroStars (2)	(Tasmania) Devonport City (2)
(Victoria (state)) Bentleigh Greens (2)	(Victoria (state)) Green Gully (2)	(Victoria (state)) Hume City (2)	(Victoria (state)) Melbourne Knights (2)
(Western Australia) Cockburn City (2)	(Western Australia) Floreat Athena (2)		

== Bracket ==
Round of 32
Devonport City	1
Lambton Jaffas	0
North Eastern MetroStars	3 (3)
Bentleigh Greens (p)	3 (4)
Hume City (p)	1 (4)
Marconi Stallions	1 (2)
Newcastle Jets	1
Melbourne Victory	3
Shamrock Rovers Darwin	0
Brisbane Strikers	6
Floreat Athena	1
Melbourne City	2
Far North Queensland	0
Edgeworth FC	3
Western Sydney Wanderers	3
Wellington Phoenix	2
Canberra Olympic	1
Surfers Paradise Apollo	0
Redlands United (a.e.t.)	2
Adelaide United	1
Melbourne Knights	2
Cockburn City	1
Green Gully	2
Central Coast Mariners	1
Blacktown City (a.e.t.)	6
Sydney United 58	2
Bonnyrigg White Eagles	3
Manly United	0
Brisbane Roar	0
Perth Glory	2
Wollongong Wolves	0
Sydney FC	3

Round of 16
Devonport City	0
Bentleigh Greens (a.e.t.)	1
Hume City	0
Melbourne Victory	1
Brisbane Strikers	1
Melbourne City	2
Edgeworth FC	1
Western Sydney Wanderers	5
Canberra Olympic	2
Redlands United	0
Melbourne Knights	1
Green Gully	3
Blacktown City	3
Bonnyrigg White Eagles	0
Perth Glory	0
Sydney FC (a.e.t.)	2

Quarter-finals
Bentleigh Greens	0
Melbourne Victory	2
Melbourne City	4
Western Sydney Wanderers	1
Canberra Olympic	1
Green Gully	0
Blacktown City	0
Sydney FC	3

Semi-finals
Melbourne Victory	0
Melbourne City	2
Canberra Olympic	0
Sydney FC	3

Final
Melbourne City	1
Sydney FC	0

== Round of 32 ==
The Round of 32 draw took place on 30 June 2016, with match information confirmed on 5 July.

The lowest ranked sides that qualified for this round were Marconi Stallions and Surfers Paradise Apollo. They were the only level 3 teams left in the competition.

All times listed below are at AEST

27 July 2016	Hume City (2)	1–1 (a.e.t.) (4–2 p)	Marconi Stallions (3)	ABD Stadium, Melbourne
19:30	Harris 117'	Report	Pavlović 94'	Attendance: 913; Referee: Jonathan Barreiro
	Penalties
	Cahill (penalty scored); Harris (penalty scored); Markelis (penalty scored); Rexhepi (penalty scored)		(penalty missed) Pavlović; (penalty scored) Rooney; (penalty scored) Ješić; (penalty missed) Godoy-Bascur

27 July 2016	Blacktown City (2)	6–2 (a.e.t.)	Sydney United 58 (2)	Lily Homes Stadium, Sydney
19:30	Gibbs 35'; Antelmi 74', 110', 120+1'; Choi 105'; Mallia 113'	Report	Payne 10'; Mileski 13'	Attendance: 877; Referee: Steve Lucas

27 July 2016	Far North Queensland (2)	0–3	Edgeworth FC (2)	Barlow Park, Cairns
19:30		Report	McLoughlin 31'; McBreen 65'; Taylor 86'	Attendance: 1,379; Referee: Casey Reibelt

27 July 2016	Shamrock Rovers Darwin (2)	0–6	Brisbane Strikers (2)	Darwin Football Stadium, Darwin
19:30		Report	Meredith 12'; Omori 14'; Bulman 18' (o.g.); Newman 68' (o.g.); Marsh 80'; Richter 88'	Attendance: 1,358; Referee: Alex King

2 August 2016	Green Gully (2)	2–1	Central Coast Mariners (1)	Green Gully Reserve, Melbourne
20:00	Boland 86', 90+2'	Report	Powell 15'	Attendance: 876; Referee: Daniel Elder

2 August 2016	Western Sydney Wanderers (1)	3–2	Wellington Phoenix (1)	Campbelltown Stadium, Sydney
20:00	Scott 40', 48'; Nichols 70'	Report	Watson 9'; Barbarouses 31'	Attendance: 3,212; Referee: Stephen Lucas

2 August 2016	North Eastern MetroStars (2)	3–3 (a.e.t.) (3–4 p)	Bentleigh Greens (2)	Elite Systems Football Centre, Adelaide
20:30	Esposito 56'; Theodorou 90+5'; Dodd 114'	Report	Lucas 26'; Pilkington 80'; Ruthven 97'	Attendance: 958; Referee: Rick Schneider
	Penalties
	Barbiero (penalty scored); van Dommele (penalty missed); Solagna (penalty scored); Simic (penalty missed); Dodd (penalty scored)		(penalty missed) Webster; (penalty scored) Lucas; (penalty scored) McCormick; (penalty scored) Holmes; (penalty scored) Ruthven

2 August 2016	Floreat Athena (2)	1–2	Melbourne City (1)	Dorrien Gardens, Perth
20:30	Gate 59'	Report	Fitzgerald 32'; Cáceres 65'	Attendance: 1,408; Referee: Adam Fielding

3 August 2016	Redlands United (2)	2–1 (a.e.t.)	Adelaide United (1)	Perry Park, Brisbane
19:30	Lee 90+4'; O'Brien 98'	Report	Kitto 62'	Attendance: 1,564; Referee: Adam Kersey

3 August 2016	Newcastle Jets (1)	1–3	Melbourne Victory (1)	Magic Park, Newcastle
19:30	Brown 50'	Report	Berisha 5'; Bozanic 54' (pen.); Howard 87'	Attendance: 1,956; Referee: Alan Milliner

3 August 2016	Canberra Olympic (2)	1–0	Surfers Paradise Apollo (3)	Deakin Stadium, Canberra
19:30	Bernabo-Madrid 35'	Report		Attendance: 1,253; Referee: Luke Withell

3 August 2016	Bonnyrigg White Eagles (2)	3–0	Manly United (2)	Bonnyrigg Sports Ground, Sydney
19:45	Robinson 59'; Kadrić 69'; Younis 90+1'	Report		Attendance: 327; Referee: Ben Abraham

10 August 2016	Wollongong Wolves (2)	0–3	Sydney FC (1)	WIN Stadium, Wollongong
19:30		Report	Simon 67', 71'; Carney 90+1'	Attendance: 8,029; Referee: Kurt Ams

10 August 2016	Brisbane Roar (1)	0–2	Perth Glory (1)	Ballymore Stadium, Brisbane
19:30		Report	Djulbic 13', 20'	Attendance: 3,028; Referee: Chris Beath

10 August 2016	Devonport City (2)	1–0	Lambton Jaffas (2)	Valley Road, Devonport
19:30	Dance 6'	Report		Attendance: 2,418; Referee: Shaun Evans

10 August 2016	Melbourne Knights (2)	2–1	Cockburn City (2)	Knights Stadium, Melbourne
19:30	Colosimo 21'; Andrijašević 70'	Report	Araya 45+1'	Attendance: 1,864; Referee: Jack Morgan

== Round of 16 ==
The Round of 16 draw took place on 10 August 2016, immediately following matchday 4 of the round of 32, with match information confirmed on 12 August.

The lowest ranked sides that qualified for this round were Bentleigh Greens, Blacktown City, Bonnyrigg White Eagles, Brisbane Strikers, Canberra Olympic, Devonport City, Edgeworth FC, Green Gully, Hume City, Melbourne Knights and Redlands United. They were the only level 2 teams left in the competition.

All times listed below are at AEST

24 August 2016	Brisbane Strikers (2)	1–2	Melbourne City (1)	Perry Park, Brisbane
19:30	Henslee 34'	Report	Fornaroli 37' (pen.), 78' (pen.)	Attendance: 3,571; Referee: Peter Green

24 August 2016	Canberra Olympic (2)	2–0	Redlands United (2)	Deakin Stadium, Canberra
19:30	Konstantinou 15' (pen.); Cattanach 90+3' (pen.)	Report		Attendance: 1,089; Referee: Katie Patterson

24 August 2016	Blacktown City (2)	3–0	Bonnyrigg White Eagles (2)	Lily Homes Stadium, Sydney
19:30	Antelmi 22', 66'; Gibbs 56'	Report		Attendance: 630; Referee: Stephen Lucas

24 August 2016	Hume City (2)	0–1	Melbourne Victory (1)	ABD Stadium, Melbourne
19:30		Report	Berisha 27' (pen.)	Attendance: 2,866; Referee: Shaun Evans

30 August 2016	Edgeworth FC (2)	1–5	Western Sydney Wanderers (1)	Magic Park, Newcastle
20:00	McBreen 59'	Report	Neville 35', 48'; Hamill 45+1'; Šantalab 84', 90'	Attendance: 2,616; Referee: Alan Milliner

30 August 2016	Devonport City (2)	0–1 (a.e.t.)	Bentleigh Greens (2)	Valley Road, Devonport
20:00		Report	Thurtell 93'	Attendance: 3,168; Referee: Daniel Elder

30 August 2016	Melbourne Knights (2)	1–3	Green Gully (2)	Knights Stadium, Melbourne
20:00	Andrijasevic 23'	Report	Boland 28', 75' (pen.); Krousoratis 39'	Attendance: 2,472; Referee: Jarred Gillett

30 August 2016	Perth Glory (1)	0–2 (a.e.t.)	Sydney FC (1)	Dorrien Gardens, Perth
20:30		Report	Ninković 98'; Brosque 113'	Attendance: 2,661; Referee: Adam Fielding

== Quarter-finals ==
The quarter-finals draw took place on 30 August 2016, immediately following the final matchday of the round of 16, with match information confirmed on 2 September.

The lowest ranked sides that qualified for this round were Bentleigh Greens, Blacktown City, Canberra Olympic and Green Gully. They were the only level 2 teams left in the competition.

All times listed below are at AEST

21 September 2016	Blacktown City (2)	0–3	Sydney FC (1)	Sydney United Sports Centre, Sydney
19:30		Report	Hološko 13'; Carney 26'; Bobô 78'	Attendance: 3,764; Referee: Peter Green

21 September 2016	Melbourne City (1)	4–1	Western Sydney Wanderers (1)	AAMI Park, Melbourne
19:30	Jakobsen 2'; Fornaroli 32'; Cahill 45' (pen.); Brandán 65'	Report	Dimas 73'	Attendance: 5,401; Referee: Jarred Gillett

27 September 2016	Bentleigh Greens (2)	0–2	Melbourne Victory (1)	Kingston Heath Soccer Complex, Melbourne
19:30		Report	Rojas 64'; Ruthven 68' (o.g.)	Attendance: 3,754; Referee: Alan Milliner

27 September 2016	Canberra Olympic (2)	1–0	Green Gully (2)	Deakin Stadium, Canberra
19:30	Konstantinou 90+6' (pen.)	Report		Attendance: 2,039; Referee: Luke Withell

== Semi-finals ==
The semi-finals draw took place on 27 September 2016, immediately following the final matchday of the quarter-finals, with the match details announced on 29 September.

The lowest ranked side that qualified for this round was Canberra Olympic, who were the only level 2 team left in the competition.

All times listed below are at AEDT

19 October 2016	Canberra Olympic (2)	0–3	Sydney FC (1)	Viking Park, Canberra
19:30		Report	Ryall 24'; Dimitrijević 65'; Ibini 82'	Attendance: 5,581; Referee: Chris Beath

25 October 2016	Melbourne Victory (1)	0–2	Melbourne City (1)	AAMI Park, Melbourne
19:30		Report	Brattan 9'; Brandán 77'	Attendance: 15,791; Referee: Shaun Evans

== Final ==
All times listed below are at AEDT

30 November 2016
19:30

Melbourne City (1)	1–0	Sydney FC (1)
Cahill 53'	Report

AAMI Park, Melbourne
Attendance: 18,751
Referee: Peter Green

== Top goalscorers ==
Rank	Player	Club	Goals
1	(Australia) Patrick Antelmi	Blacktown City	5
2	(Australia) Liam Boland	Green Gully	4
3	(Uruguay) Bruno Fornaroli	Melbourne City	3
4	(Australia) Stipo Andrijašević	Melbourne Knights	2
4	(Albania) Besart Berisha	Melbourne Victory	2
4	(Argentina) Fernando Brandán	Melbourne City	2
4	(Australia) Tim Cahill	Melbourne City	2
4	(Australia) David Carney	Sydney FC	2
4	(Australia) Dino Djulbic	Perth Glory	2
4	(Australia) Joey Gibbs	Blacktown City	2
4	(Scotland) Greig Henslee	Brisbane Strikers	2
4	(Australia) Angelo Konstantinou	Canberra Olympic	2
4	(Australia) Daniel McBreen	Edgeworth Eagles	2
4	(Australia) Matt Simon	Sydney FC	2

Note: Goals scored in preliminary rounds not included.

== Broadcasting rights ==
The live television rights for the competition were held by the subscription network Fox Sports, who broadcast 11 games live, with live updates and crosses from a single camera at the concurrent matches for goals and highlights. Games not broadcast on Fox Sports were streamed live via their online services.
