= Ruon Tongyik =

Australian soccer player

- Tonyik playing for Central Coast Mariners in 2020

Personal information
- Full name: Ruon Kuk Tongyik
- Date of birth: 28 December 1996 (age 29)
- Place of birth: Sudan (now South Sudan)
- Height: 1.85 m (6 ft 1 in)
- Position: Central defender

Senior career*
Years	Team	Apps	(Gls)
2013	Adelaide Olympic	28	(0)
2014–2016	Adelaide United NPL	28	(0)
2015–2016	Adelaide United	0	(0)
2016–2018	Melbourne City	15	(0)
2018–2019	Western Sydney Wanderers	2	(0)
2019	Brisbane Roar	8	(0)
2019–2022	Central Coast Mariners	41	(1)
2022–2024	Western Sydney Wanderers	4	(0)
2023	→ Mes Kerman (loan)	9	(1)
2025–2026	Western Sydney Wanderers	10	(0)

International career^{‡}
2017–2018	Australia U23	3	(0)
2021	Australia	2	(0)
- * Club domestic league appearances and goals as of 11 August 2025 ‡ National team caps and goals as of 12 June 2021

Ruon Kuk Tongyik (Dinka: [ɻu̯ɔ́n kùk tɔ́ɲɟɪk]; 28 December 1996) is a professional soccer player who last played as a central defender for Western Sydney Wanderers. Born in South Sudan, he has represented Australia internationally.

== Club career ==
=== Melbourne City ===
After being named Adelaide United's "Youth Player of the Year", Tongyik joined Melbourne City in July 2016 on a two-year contract. He made his debut for City on 9 December 2016 in a 1–1 draw against Sydney FC at Stadium Australia.

=== Western Sydney Wanderers ===
On 3 May 2018, Tongyik was released by Melbourne City and joined Western Sydney Wanderers.

In January 2019, he was released by Western Sydney Wanderers.

=== Brisbane Roar ===
On 6 February 2019 Brisbane Roar FC announced that Tongyik had signed for the club for the remainder of the 2018–19 season.

=== Central Coast Mariners ===
In May 2019, Tongyik signed with Central Coast Mariners on a two-year deal.

In June 2022, Tongyik was released at the conclusion of the 2021–22 season after two seasons with the Mariners.

=== Return to Western Sydney Wanderers ===
In July 2022, Tongyik re-joined the Western Sydney Wanderers on a two-year contract.

Tongyik was then loaned to Persian Gulf Pro League club Mes Kerman in January 2023 on a year-long loan. The club was relegated to the Azadegan League and imposed fines on the players which it tried to enforce by keeping their passports. At the end of the season, Tongyik returned to parent club Western Sydney Wanderers and was included in the squad for their first official game, the Round of 32 of the 2023 Australia Cup.

After Tongyik was granted bail at Penrith Local Court on 20 October 2023, Western Sydney Wanderers and Football Australia imposed a no-fault interim suspension from participating in football and club-related activities.

He returned to football in 2025, appearing as a trialist during a pre-season international friendly match for the Wanderers against Persib Bandung of Indonesia. Shortly after the match, Wanderers confirmed his signing.

== International career ==
After representing Australia at under-23 level, he was called up by the South Sudan national team in September 2019.

Tongyik received his first selection for the Australian national team in May 2021. He made his international debut on 7 June 2021 in a World Cup Qualifier against Chinese Taipei.

In August 2021, Tongyik was stood down from the Socceroos and deselected from the Olympics squad due to charges of sexual assault. He was found not guilty of all charges in March 2025.

== Personal life ==
Born in South Sudan, Tongyik lived there for about three years, and had stayed with relatives in Ethiopia while documents allowing him and his family to move to Australia were processed. Tongyik moved to Australia in 2003, aged 6. He has 3 younger sisters and 1 younger brother. They all currently live in Adelaide.

=== Criminal trial and not guilty verdict ===
On 20 October 2023, Tongyik was charged with sexual intercourse without consent in connection with an alleged incident that occurred in 2018 in Mount Druitt. He was granted bail under strict conditions, including residing at his home in Bellevue Hill, New South Wales, daily reporting to Waverley police station, surrendering his passport, and having only one mobile phone.

Tongyik was found not guilty on all charges in a trial held in March 2025.

== Career statistics ==
=== International ===
As of match played 11 June 2021

Australia
Year	Apps	Goals
2021	2	0
Total	2	0
