= Bruno Fornaroli =

Australian soccer player (born 1987)

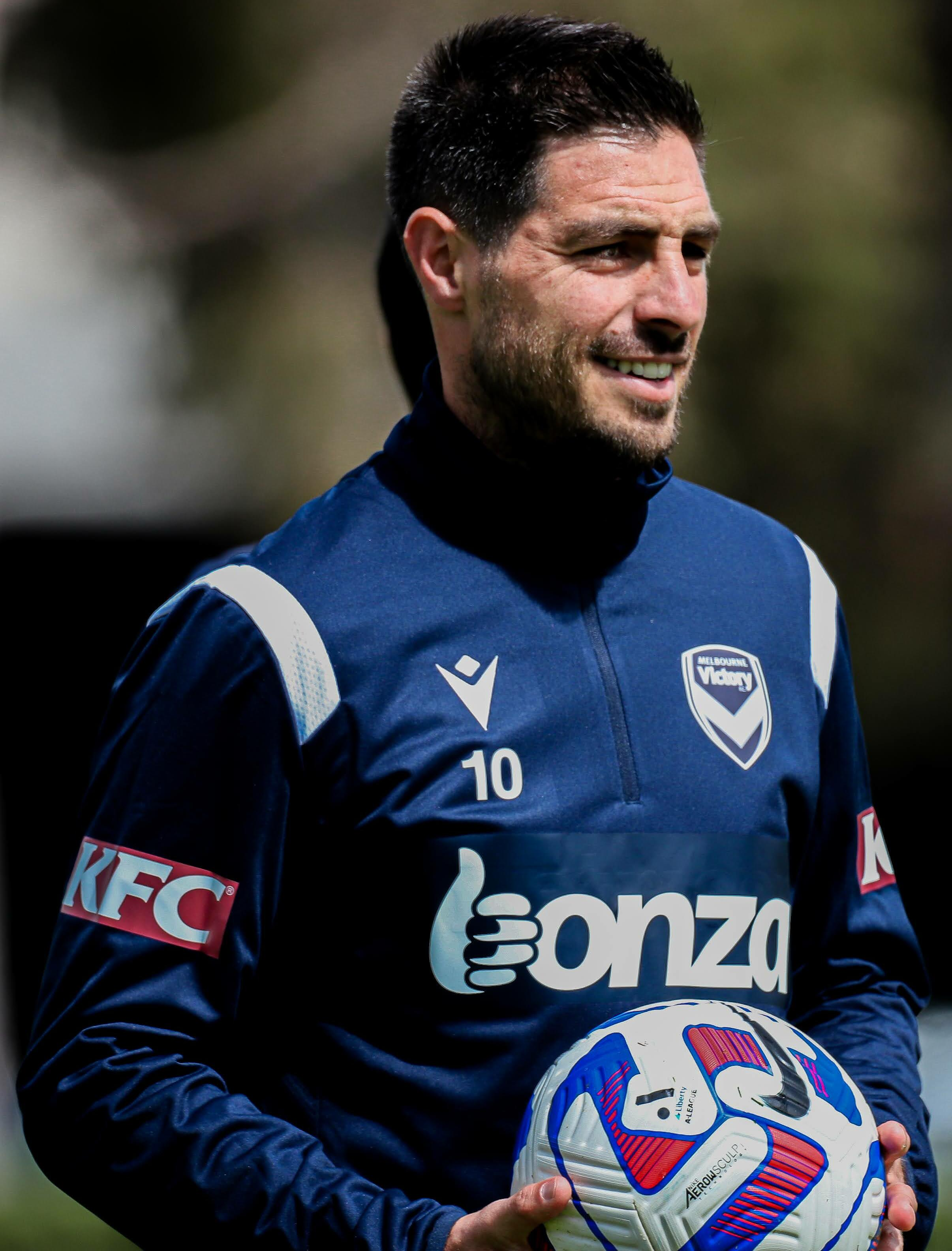
- Fornaroli with Melbourne Victory in 2022

Personal information
- Full name: Bruno Fornaroli Mezza
- Date of birth: 7 September 1987 (age 39)
- Place of birth: Salto, Uruguay
- Height: 1.75 m (5 ft 9 in)
- Positions: Striker; attacking midfielder

Youth career
- 2005–2007: Nacional

Senior career*
Years	Team	Apps	(Gls)
2006–2008	Nacional	29	(15)
2008–2012	Sampdoria	11	(0)
2009	→ San Lorenzo (loan)	12	(2)
2009–2010	→ Recreativo Huelva (loan)	17	(2)
2011	→ Nacional (loan)	9	(4)
2012–2013	Panathinaikos	17	(0)
2014–2015	Danubio	25	(5)
2014	→ Figueirense (loan)	0	(0)
2015–2019	Melbourne City	70	(48)
2019–2022	Perth Glory	72	(34)
2022–2025	Melbourne Victory	72	(30)
2025–2026	Avondale FC	24	(20)

International career^{‡}
2003	Uruguay U17		
2022–2024	Australia	7	(0)
- * Club domestic league appearances and goals as of 26 June 2026 ‡ National team caps and goals as of 2 February 2024

Bruno Fornaroli Mezza (Spanish pronunciation: [ˈbɾuno foɾnaˈɾoli]; born 7 September 1987) is a professional soccer player who plays as a forward or attacking midfielder, most recently for Australian club Avondale FC. Born in Uruguay, he has played for the Australia national team.

== Club career ==
=== Nacional ===
Fornaroli was born in Salto, in northwestern Uruguay to an Italian-Uruguayan family. He started playing football at the age of 3, and by the age of 12, he travelled to Montevideo by bus after being offered a trial by Nacional, hoping to become a professional footballer. On the same bus, he befriended Luis Suárez, who was visiting his parents in Salto and would later become his teammate in the youth teams of Nacional.

During his time in the youth teams of Nacional, Fornaroli was given the nickname "El Tuna" (The Prickly Pear) due to his spiky hairstyle. On 6 July 2006, he made his senior debut, at the age of 18, in a 3–0 win against Rentistas at the Estadio Gran Parque Central. Fornaroli scored two goals, the first in his professional career, in a 2–1 Uruguayan Clásico win against Peñarol in the opening round of the 2007–08 Primera División. After the match, Fornaroli dedicated the victory to his mother, who had just turned 40 at the time. He ended his debut season, scoring 17 goals in 37 appearances for the club in the Primera División and Copa Libertadores.

=== Sampdoria ===
On 22 July 2008, Fornaroli signed a three-year contract with Sampdoria, for a transfer fee of €3 million and a salary of €300,000. Additionally, a sale clause was included, demanding that 50% of Fornaroli's future transfer fee will be allocated to Nacional. He received the number 9 after having requested and replaced Vincenzo Montella who returned to Roma from his expired loan deal with Sampdoria. Additionally, due to his Italian ancestry, Fornaroli obtained citizenship, which resulted in him being registered as a non-EU player for the club.

He made his Serie A debut on 14 September 2008 in a 2–0 defeat against Lazio at the Olimpico, coming on for Paolo Sammarco in the 75th minute. Five days later, he scored on his Europa League debut, after coming off the bench, and contributing to a 5–0 home win against Kaunas. He would score again in the returning away fixture against Kaunas, helping his side win the match 2–1 after being down a goal in the first half. On 13 November, Fornaroli scored the winning goal, from a penalty, in a 2–1 win against Empoli in the Coppa Italia. During the league campaign, Fornaroli struggled to find playing time within the squad despite chants from the fans who wanted to see him play when he was on the bench during games. By the end of January 2009, he amassed a total of 69 minutes played in 5 appearances in the Serie A.

==== Loan to San Lorenzo ====
On 10 February 2009, Fornaroli was confirmed to have been sent on loan to the Argentine club San Lorenzo in the First Division, with an option to extend for a fee of €100,000. Despite Argentine media speculating his first-team debut against Estudiantes, he was instead put to train with the reserve team for the club. Fornaroli scored on his reserve debut on 25 February leading his side to win 3–2 against Estudiantes reserves and impressed coach Miguel Ángel Russo who watched from the stands. His impressive performances for the reserves during matches and training led to him earning his first-team debut on 5 March, in the Copa Libertadores, against Libertad, coming off the bench in the 76th minute. Four days later, he started on his league debut in a 3–1 away loss against Rosario Central. On 18 May, Fornaroli scored two goals off the bench, his first for the club, in a 3–0 win against Gimnasia Jujuy. Fornaroli departed San Lorenzo following the end of his loan on 30 June, in total, making 15 appearances and 2 goals for the club. Sampdoria offered Fornaroli to San Lorenzo for a second season on loan but was rejected due to his high salary demands and his ability within the squad which would only make him a substitute player.

==== Loan to Huelva ====
On 30 August 2009, Fornaroli would be sent out on loan to Recreativo Huelva in the Spanish Second Division. In November, after a training session, Fornaroli would be seen in a heated argument with coach Javi López due to the frustration of his playing time. The incident sparked the attention of the local media and witnesses who were around the ground. On 7 January 2010, Fornaroli scored a goal in the quarter-finals first leg of the Copa del Rey, where his side won 3–0, against Atlético Madrid at the Estadio Nuevo Colombino. However, Huelva would be knocked out of the competition in the second leg after losing 5–1 (5–4 on aggregate) in the second leg. Fornaroli continued to struggle to find playing time under new coach Raül Agné, having only scored 2 goals out of 15 appearances in the league by March, leading him to be dropped from the squad for the rest of the season.

==== Loan to Nacional ====
On 7 November 2010, Fornaroli made his return to Sampdoria, playing 3 minutes against Catania – the first time he had played for Sampdoria in 664 days. He was sent out on loan for a third time, returning to his former club Nacional on 26 January 2011. He made his homecoming debut against Montevideo Wanderers, on 5 February, at the Estadio Gran Parque Central. On 30 March, Fornaroli scored his first goal of the season, in the 23rd minute of the match, to bring the score to 1–1. He added his second the same match, a brace from a penalty, in the 85th to end the match in a 5–2 win against El Tanque Sisley. On 10 April, Fornaroli added his third and fourth goal in a 3–0 win against local club Tacuarembó. He made his tenth Clásico appearance for Nacional against Peñarol on 8 May 2011. Fornaroli would earn his first league medal after Nacional won the league in the Closing Stage of the competition.

==== 2011–12: Return to Sampdoria ====
Following the end of his loan, Fornaroli returned to Sampdoria on 27 July 2011. He made his first appearance, coming off the bench for Cristian Bertani in the 89th minute, against Livorno on 30 August. He made his first start, on 1 November, against Crotone, being applauded from the attending fans as his name was called before the start of the match. At the end of the 2011–12 season, he made 11 league appearances without scoring a goal for Sampdoria.

=== Panathinaikos ===
On 18 July 2012, Sampdoria announced that Fornaroli had been sold to the Uruguayan club Boston River. However, three days later, Fornaroli signed a three-year contract with Greek side Panathinaikos for an undisclosed fee, after talks with manager Jesualdo Ferreira who requested to have him in his team. On 31 July, he made his club debut, coming off the bench in the 85th minute, in a 2–0 away win against Motherwell of the Champions League third qualifying round first leg. He made his league debut on 25 August, coming off the bench again, against Levadiakos at Levadia Municipal Stadium. After three months of having not scored a goal since joining the club, Fornaroli ended his goal drought on 29 November, scoring two goals in a cup match, in a 4–0 win against Proodeftiki. On 2 September 2013, Panathinaikos announced the termination of Fornaroli's contract following his poor performances in the attack, ending his season with 0 goals in 17 league appearances for the club. Fornaroli moved back to Uruguay to train with Nacional, after receiving permission to do so, to maintain his fitness. However, he was not offered an official contract from the club.

=== Danubio ===
On 9 January 2014, Fornaroli signed a contract with Danubio alongside Jorge Zambrana who joined the same day. A month since signing, Fornaroli scored his first goal for the club, securing a 3–2 win against Juventud at the Estadio Parque Artigas Las Piedras. He scored his second goal on 18 May, helping his side come back to draw 3–3 against Sud América after being down 3–0 in the first half. On 8 June, Fornaroli was named in the starting lineup in the Primera División final against Montevideo Wanderers. He was taken off in the 61st minute of the match before his side won 3–2 on penalties after the score drew 2–2 on aggregate (1–1 in both legs) at the end of extra time. This led to Fornaroli earning his second league title in Uruguay and Danubio's first title in 82 years, with the club crediting his contributions to his leadership role in the squad.

On 20 June, Fornaroli would move to Florianópolis from Montevideo to sign a contract with Figueirense after passing his medical. Three days later, on 23 June, it was confirmed that Fornaroli had completed a loan move to Figueirense following the acceptance of his work visa. Throughout the league season, Fornaroli faced difficulty in terms of getting game time, as he was the only player among the registered 38 players who did not make an appearance for the club. He returned to Uruguay without registering a competitive appearance for Figueirense in January 2015.

Fornaroli began his 2014–2015 campaign midway through the season and found the back of the net for the first time since returning on 22 March 2015. He scored in his third appearance for the club as he helped his team secure a 2–1 win against his former club, Nacional. He departed at the end of the season, leaving with 5 goals in 25 league appearances in total for Danubio. He soon moved to England to train under Patrick Vieira at Manchester City before being linked with a move to Melbourne City.

=== Melbourne City ===
==== 2015–16 ====
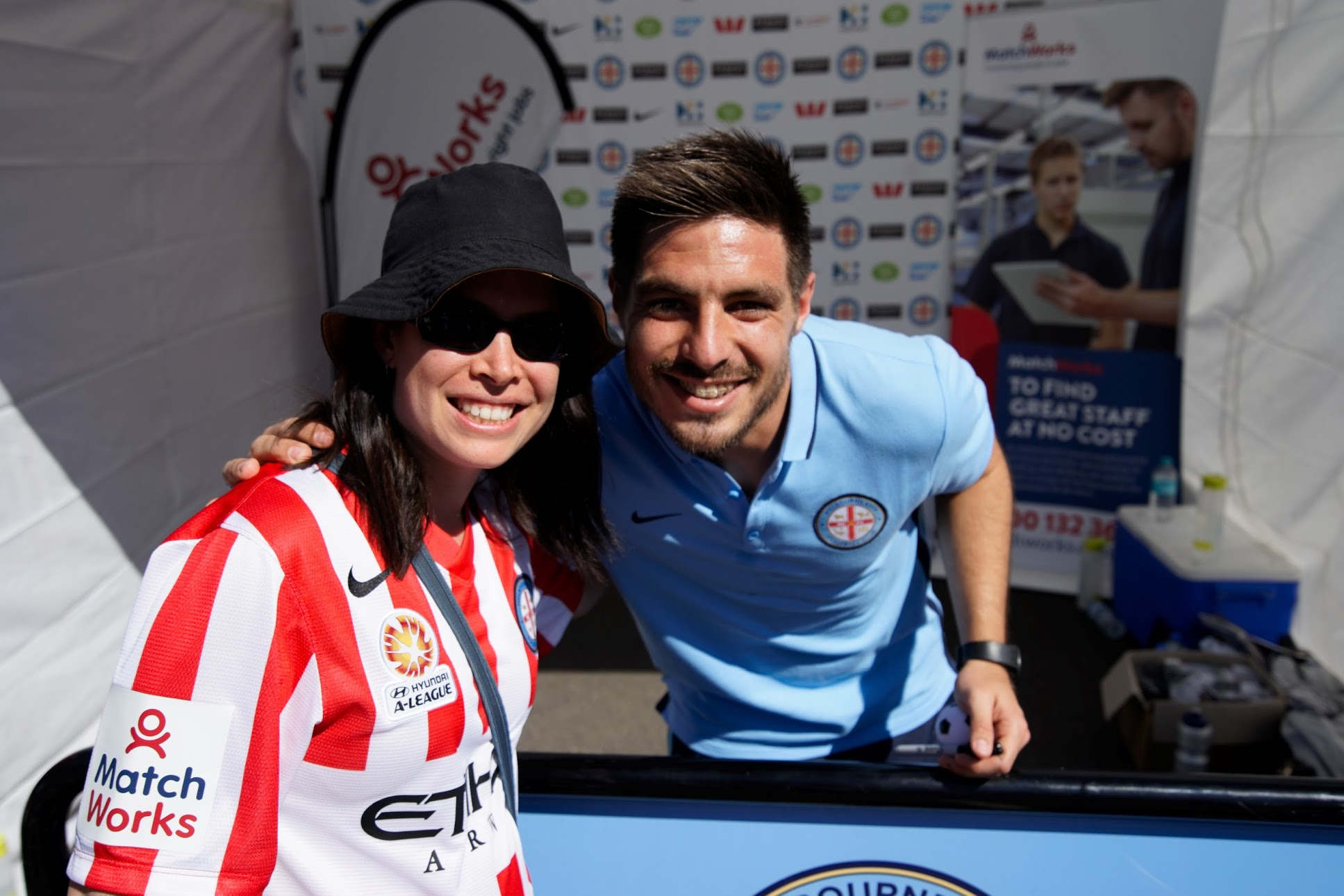
Fornaroli in 2015

On 10 August 2015, Fornaroli finalised a two-year deal with A-League club Melbourne City. He received the number 23 and acquired the fourth visa spot in the squad. He is also the fourth Uruguayan to have joined the A-League after Osvaldo Carro (2005–06), Mateo Corbo (2005–06) and Francisco Usúcar (2011–12).

Fornaroli made his debut on 26 August 2015 in a 5–1 home win against Wellington Phoenix in the FFA Cup, converting a penalty in the 32nd minute. In the following round, he scored two goals, netting the opening goal and a brace, in a 5–0 win against Heidelberg United at Olympic Village. On 17 October, he scored his first league goal in a 3–2 Melbourne Derby loss against Melbourne Victory in his second league appearance. Over the next month, he would go on to score 4 goals in 3 games, with 2 goals each, as Melbourne City defeated Central Coast Mariners (3–1) and Adelaide United (4–2) respectively. His start to the season received praise and much surprise to those who had doubts over the signing, as Herald Sun described, "shown glimpses of the potential that City fans have borne witness to over the past two months". He scored the only goal against Brisbane Roar on 28 December, marking his 10th goal of the season, as his side loss 3–1. He was named PFA A-League Player of the Month after scoring 4 goals during December.

On 25 January 2016, Fornaroli scored his 13th goal against Wellington, surpassing David Williams's record for most goals in a league season for Melbourne City. He earned his second Player of the Month for his performance in January, becoming the first player to have received the award on two occasions. On 7 February, Fornaroli scored the only goal as Melbourne lost 2–1 against Newcastle Jets. Despite the loss, Fornaroli's goal equalled Marc Janko's record for the fastest player to reach 15 goals in the league and overtook Aaron Mooy as Melbourne City’s second leading all-time goalscorer, all in his 18th game for the club. Fornaroli scored twice, in his third Melbourne Derby derby appearance on 13 February as City drew 2–2 with Melbourne Victory. His first goal was a rabona-style strike that received praises from media who dubbed it as a "goal of the season" contender. Additionally, he became the first Melbourne City player to net a goal in four consecutive appearances.

On 5 March, Fornaroli scored his first senior hat-trick against Sydney FC, being the only goalscorer as City won 3–0. With his goals, he overtook Besart Berisha's record of 19 goals, establishing himself as the first player in A-League history to reach 20 goals in a single season. His impressive record-breaking performances would give his title as "the best specialist forward to have ever played in the A-League," by The Sydney Morning Herald who put him above the likes of notable marquee players such as Dwight Yorke and Alessandro Del Piero.

In April, Fornaroli would receive the A-League Golden Boot for his 23 goals and voted second for the Johnny Warren Medal, losing to Perth Glory's Diego Castro. He was awarded the club's A-League Player of the Year, sharing it jointly with Aaron Mooy, and the Etihad Supporters’ Player of the Year. On 17 April, Fornaroli netted two goals, including a brace featuring an overhead kick, in a 2–0 win against Perth Glory in the elimination final. His overhead kick garnered media attention as another "goal of the season" contender and ended his debut season with 25 goals for Melbourne City.

==== 2016–17 ====
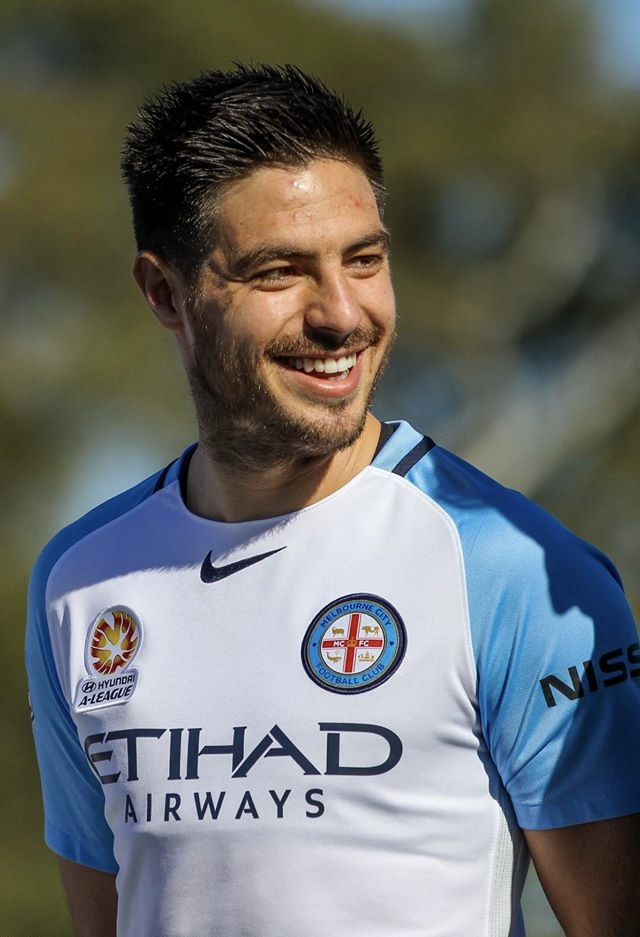
Fornaroli in 2016

On 8 August 2016, Fornaroli signed a three-year extension until 2019 as a marquee player, earning around $23,000 per week with a minimum of $250,000 in bonuses. The new season aligned him with a strike partnership with Australian international Tim Cahill who recently joined as a marquee signing. The two first started together on 21 September in a FFA Cup match against Western Sydney Wanderers. Fornaroli scored his third goal of the cup campaign, netting the match's second goal after a cutback pass from Cahill. 12 minutes later, he won a penalty after a push from Nikolai Topor-Stanley and allowed Cahill to score his first goal for the club. The score ended in a 4–1 win at AAMI Park. Four days later, following the retirement of Patrick Kisnorbo, Fornaroli was named the new captain for Melbourne City.

On 5 October, Fornaroli began the 2016–17 A-League season, scoring his first goal in a 4–1 Melbourne Derby win against Melbourne Victory at Etihad Stadium. On 10 November, Fornaroli scored twice for City contributing to a 2–1 win against Newcastle. With his first goal, he tallied his 30th goal in his 35th appearance for Melbourne City making him the quickest to score 30 goals in A-League history. On 30 November, Fornaroli led his side to their first trophy in the FFA Cup final, winning 1–0 against Sydney FC and awarded the man of the match at full-time. On the same day, Fornaroli was reprimanded from the FFA after uttering an expletive during his victory speech. He later explained on the situation, saying his intent was to say "vamos" (Let's go) but got lost in translation due to English being his second language.

On 5 March, in his 50th appearance for the club, Fornaroli delivered a man-of-the-match performance by scoring two goals—a free kick and the winning goal—that propelled him to reach a milestone of 40 goals. His contributions played a pivotal role in Melbourne City's 3–2 away win against Central Coast Mariners. A month later, on April Fool's Day, Melbourne City pulled a prank on their Twitter account by announcing that Fornaroli was eligible to represent Australia, stating, "excited to see @BFornaroli in the Green and Gold." By this time, Fornaroli scored 17 league goals in 23 appearances for the club whilst hitting the target 63.2% of the time.

==== 2017–19 ====
In his third FFA Cup campaign, Fornaroli scored a brace, leading his team to a 2–0 victory against Peninsula Power in the Round of 32. However, in the following round, Fornaroli sustained an ankle injury in the 37th minute of the match against Hakoah. Subsequent medical evaluations and scans confirmed a diagnosis of a sprained ankle, necessitating a two-month recovery period. To stimulate his recovery, Fornaroli underwent surgery and commenced the rehabilitation process in the ensuing days.

In light of Fornaroli's absence, Melbourne City announced the loan signing of Scottish striker Ross McCormack from Aston Villa on 29 September 2017, to provide a temporary replacement. On 7 February 2018, Fornaroli made his unofficial return in a friendly, playing 67 minutes, against Chinese club Guangzhou R&F. He made his competitive return, just three days later, being brought on in the 64th minute against Sydney FC. By the end of the regular league season, Fornaroli scored 5 goals in 6 appearances, with a goal in each of City's last 4 games, leading them to Finals qualification.

Ahead of the 2018–19 season, Fornaroli scored the winning goal in the 120th minute of extra time to seal a 1–0 win against Brisbane Roar in Round of 32 of the FFA Cup. He scored the winner in the next round, sealing yet another 1–0 win over Newcastle in the 52nd minute. However, in the subsequent round against Western Sydney Wanderers, Fornaroli missed a penalty early in the game as his side suffered a 2–1 defeat and were eliminated from the competition. Manager Warren Joyce expressed his dissatisfaction with Fornaroli's missed penalty, criticising his perceived lack of focus and effectiveness during the match, which deviated from his typically reliable performance.

During the A-League season, Fornaroli scored a brace in a 2–0 victory against Wellington Phoenix at AAMI Park. However, this would be Fornaroli's final appearance with the club following a heated discussion and falling out with manager Warren Joyce. As a result, Fornaroli was dropped from the starting lineup for the match against Brisbane Roar and was rumoured to have declined the opportunity to be named on the bench, leading to his exclusion from the match squad. This continued as he was not included in the team sheet for the next match against Newcastle due to concerns about his attitude and failure to meet the required standards during training. Warren Joyce explained his decision, emphasizing that every player is treated equally and evaluated on a daily basis to ensure they meet the expected standards.

In December, Melbourne City transfer-listed Fornaroli after he had gone without making an appearance for the club since November. However, offloading his $1.5 million salary proved to be difficult due to A-League rules prohibiting transfer fees between domestic clubs despite interests from Sydney FC, Adelaide United and Perth Glory. As a result, on 26 February 2019, Fornaroli's contract was terminated by mutual agreement with immediate effect.

=== Perth Glory ===
On 22 March 2019, Fornaroli signed a two-year deal with Perth Glory. He was allocated the number 10 but soon changed to 9, following the departure of Andy Keogh to Saudi Arabia. He was set to play next season in the 2019–20 A-League season.

==== 2019–21 ====
Fornaroli made his club debut on 7 August, against Western Sydney Wanderers, which resulted in his side being eliminated in injury time during the FFA Cup. He then made his league debut on 13 October, playing the full 90 minutes, in a 1–1 draw against Brisbane Roar at HBF Park. Two weeks later, he scored his first goal for the club, opening the score as Perth won 2–1 against Wellington Phoenix. He scored his 2nd goal of the season in a 3–1 defeat to Sydney FC on 23 November. In doing so, he became the quickest player to score 50 goals in A-League history, beating Besart Berisha and Shane Smeltz's joint record in 76 appearances. On 21 December, he scored twice in the club’s final game of the decade at HBF Park, securing a "stunning" 6–2 win over Newcastle Jets.

Fornaroli scored his 5th goal in his last 4 appearances, a brace on 19 January 2020, and securing the club, a record 6th successive A-League win after beating Western Sydney Wanderers 1–0. He scored his second brace of the season, on 7 February, securing Perth's lead in the 90th minute to a 4–2 victory over Wellington. For his contributions during the season, Fornaroli was awarded the club's Most Glorious Player Men's Award, sharing it jointly with midfielder Neil Kilkenny – becoming the second players to have shared the award, and the Golden Boot Award for his 13 goals for the club during the A-League season. On 30 November, Fornaroli scored his first AFC Champions League goal, the opener against Shanghai Shenhua just before half time. The match ended in a 3–3 draw, leading to Perth's first-ever point in the AFC Champions League.

Fornaroli started his 2020–21 campaign, scoring in the opening round to secure his side a 5–3 win against Adelaide United at HBF Park. Three days later, he assisted, passing to the left to Carlo Armiento who shot past Filip Kurto, and later scored in the 58th minute to make a 2–1 lead over Western United. The match ended in a 5–4 defeat for Perth with an A-League record of 8 goals scored in the 2nd half. On 5 June 2021, Fornaroli scored a "stunner", to bring his tally to 13 goals in the season, in a 1–1 draw against Newcastle. He signed a new two-year contract, on 15 June, following the conclusion of the season after being the club's leading goalscorer for two consecutive years. Fornaroli was named on three awards by Perth Glory, earning the club's 2021 Most Glorious Player Award, Players’ Player of the Year Award and the A-League Golden Boot.

==== 2021–23 ====
The 2021–22 A-League season saw Fornaroli form a strike partnership with Daniel Sturridge, who signed on a marquee contract. On 20 November, Fornaroli scored the first goal of the 2021–22 season for Perth, a long range effort past James Delianov, to draw the game 1–1 against Adelaide United. He scored a brace in the 85th minute on 22 January 2022, to secure a 2–0 lead against Sydney FC. The score was 2–1 by full time at Jubilee Stadium. On 20 February, Fornaroli scored twice, including his second brace and 5th goal of the season, to secure a vital 2–0 victory over Brisbane Roar to close the 7 point gap to third place.

In October, he would play two games for Perth in the 2022–23 season before being dropped in the match against Central Coast Mariners due to injury. Although Fornaroli denied these claims made by Perth, saying he was fully fit. The following week, a statement was released by the club that Fornaroli's contract was terminated by mutual agreement with immediate effect. A press conference set by Ruben Zadkovich, clarified the situation, with Zadkovich stating, "Bruno wasn’t chosen to start in a game and then refused to sit on the bench, and he didn’t want to play. Once a player makes that decision that he doesn’t want to put his body on the line for the team, it becomes really easy for me."

=== Melbourne Victory ===
On 31 October 2022, Fornaroli signed a deal to Melbourne Victory, having been released from Perth just a few days prior. He joined the team as an injury replacement player for defender Matthew Spiranovic, reuniting with Tony Popovic and formed an attacking trio with Nani and former Glory player Chris Ikonomidis.

==== 2022–2023 ====
Fornaroli made his club debut on 4 November, scoring a penalty in the 89th-minute after a hand-ball from Mark Natta, in a 4–0 win against Newcastle. Following his maiden goal, he made a further 4 appearances before being signed on a permanent basis on 18 January 2023, after the opening of the January transfer window. On 3 February, Fornaroli made his 150th A-League appearance against Wellington Phoenix, netting the equaliser past Oliver Sail, before goals from Jake Brimmer and Tomi Juric ended the match in a 3–1 win at AAMI Park. On 18 February, he scored in his first Melbourne Derby match for Melbourne Victory, in a 3–2 win over his former club Melbourne City – becoming the first player to have scored for both clubs in the Melbourne Derby. At the conclusion of the season, Fornaroli was named on the club's Player’s Player award and TAC Golden Boot for his 7 goals in the league as the club's top-goalscorer.

==== 2023–2024 ====
In the 2023–24 A-League Men season, Fornaroli won the club's golden boot with 18 goals.

==== 2024–2025 ====
Despite his good form in the previous season, in the 2024–25 A-League Men season, Fornaroli became the third choice striker, behind Nikos Vergos and Jing Reec.

Fornaroli's contract with Melbourne Victory expired at the end of the 2024–25 A-League Men season, with the club confirming in September that he didn't extend his contract and transitioned to an off-field role.

== International career ==
Fornaroli was a member of the Uruguay team at the 2003 South American U-17 Championship in Bolivia. He scored in Uruguay's group match against Venezuela.

In 2018, Fornaroli indicated that he would be keen to play for the Australian national team if he was able to secure Australian citizenship. However, under FIFA eligibility rules applicable at the time, this was not possible as Fornaroli had represented Uruguayan youth teams before acquiring Australian citizenship.

Following a change to FIFA eligibility rules in 2020 and his acquisition of an Australian passport, Fornaroli was called up to the Australian squad for 2022 FIFA World Cup qualification matches against Japan and Saudi Arabia in March 2022.

On 24 March 2022, Fornaroli made his debut for Australia as a substitute in a World Cup qualifying loss to Japan. In doing so, he became the oldest debutant for the "Socceroos" of all time. He made his second appearance and first start for the side days later in a loss to Saudi Arabia.

He was included in the final squad of Australia for the 2023 AFC Asian Cup, making his competitive debut for the Socceroos in the opening match against India, thus permanently cap-tied him to Australia.

== Personal life ==
Fornaroli is not related to Italian racing driver Leonardo Fornaroli. He has a close friendship with talismanic Uruguayan striker Luis Suárez, as they first met each other at the age of 12. Both hailed from Salto and started their careers with Nacional. When Fornaroli was summoned to play at the 2023 AFC Asian Cup for Australia, Suárez was the first to congratulate him.

== Career statistics ==
=== Club ===
As of match played 31 May 2025

Appearances and goals by club, season and competition
Club	Season	League			National cup (Note: Includes Coppa Italia, Copa del Rey, Greek Football Cup, Australia Cup)		Continental		Total	
Club	Season	Division	Apps	Goals	Apps	Goals	Apps	Goals	Apps	Goals
Nacional	2007–08	Uruguayan Primera División	29	15	–		8 (Note: Appearances in Copa Libertadores)	2	37	17
Sampdoria	2008–09	Serie A	5	0	1	1	4 (Note: Appearances in UEFA Cup)	2	10	3
Sampdoria	2010–11	Serie A	1	0	0	0	–		1	0
Sampdoria	2011–12	Serie B	11	0	0	0	–		11	0
Sampdoria	Total		17	0	1	1	4	2	22	3
San Lorenzo (loan)	2008–09	Argentine Primera División	12	2	–		3	0	15	2
Recreativo Huelva (loan)	2009–10	Segunda División	17	2	3	1	–		20	3
Nacional (loan)	2010–11	Uruguayan Primera División	9	4	–		4	0	13	4
Panathinaikos	2012–13	Super League Greece	20	0	4	2	7 (Note: Appearances in UEFA Europa League)	0	31	2
Danubio	2013–14	Uruguayan Primera División	14	2	–		0	0	14	2
Danubio	2014–15	Uruguayan Primera División	11	3	–		6 (Note: Appearances in Copa Sudamericana)	0	17	3
Danubio	Total		25	5	7	3	6	0	31	5
Melbourne City	2015–16	A-League	29	25	3	3	–		32	28
Melbourne City	2016–17	A-League	27	17	5	3	–		32	20
Melbourne City	2017–18	A-League	10	5	2	1	–		12	6
Melbourne City	2018–19	A-League	4	1	3	2	–		7	3
Melbourne City	Total		70	48	13	9	0	0	83	57
Perth Glory	2019–20	A-League	28	13	1	0	6 (Note: Appearances in AFC Champions League)	1	35	14
Perth Glory	2020–21	A-League	26	13	–		–		26	13
Perth Glory	2021–22	A-League	14	7	–		–		14	7
Perth Glory	2022–23	A-League Men	2	0	0	0	–		2	0
Perth Glory	Total		70	33	1	0	6	1	77	34
Melbourne Victory	2022–23	A-League Men	20	7	–		–		20	7
Melbourne Victory	2023–24	A-League Men	20	18	–		–		20	18
Melbourne Victory	2024–25	A-League Men	27	5	3	1	–		30	6
Melbourne Victory	Total		72	30	3	1	–		70	31
Career total			299	131	25	14	38	5	359	147

=== International ===
As of match played 2 February 2024

Appearances and goals by national team and year
National team	Year	Apps	Goals
Australia	2022	2	0
Australia	2023	0	0
Australia	2024	5	0
Total		7	0

== Honours ==
Nacional

- Uruguayan Primera División: 2010–11

Danubio

- Uruguayan Primera División: 2013–14

Melbourne City

- FFA Cup: 2016

Individual

- Melbourne City Player of the Year: 2015–16
- PFA A-League Team of the Season: 2015–16, 2023–24
- A-League Golden Boot: 2015–16
- Mark Viduka Medal: 2016

Records

- Quickest to reach 30 goals in the A-league
