= Nick Fitzgerald (soccer) =

Australian footballer (born 1992)

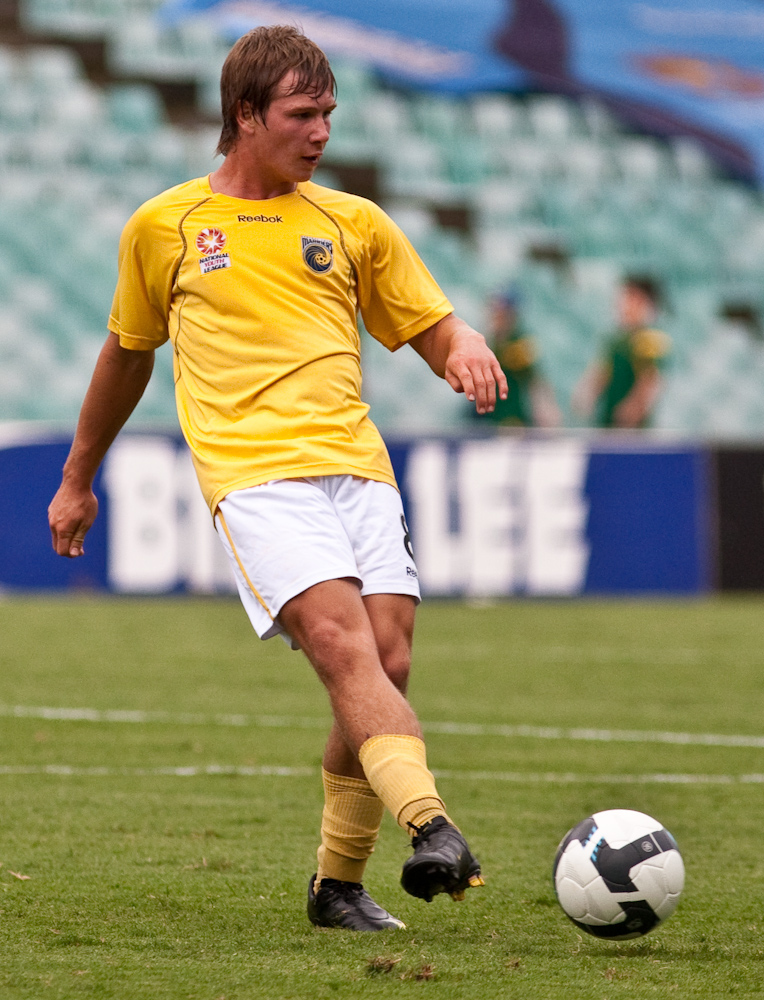
- Fitzgerald playing for Central Coast Mariners Youth in 2009

Personal information
- Full name: Nicholas John Fitzgerald
- Date of birth: 13 February 1992 (age 34)
- Place of birth: Wahroonga, New South Wales, Australia
- Height: 1.75 m (5 ft 9 in)
- Positions: Winger; striker

Team information
- Current team: Sydney Olympic
- Number: 29

Youth career
- Castle Hill United
- Ku-Ring-Gai
- Northern Spirit
- 2008–2009: NSWIS
- 2008–2010: Blacktown City Demons
- 2009–2011: CCM Academy

Senior career*
Years	Team	Apps	(Gls)
2008–2010	Blacktown City	2	(0)
2010	Central Coast Mariners	1	(0)
2010	→ Bundaberg Spirit (loan)	12	(5)
2011–2013	Brisbane Roar	23	(1)
2013–2016	Central Coast Mariners	70	(7)
2016–2018	Melbourne City	70	(9)
2018–2019	Western Sydney Wanderers	12	(0)
2019–2020	Newcastle Jets	20	(3)
2020–2021	Jamshedpur	8	(0)
2022	Perth Glory	13	(1)
2023–	Sydney Olympic	25	(4)

International career
2012	Australia U20	3	(0)
2012	Australia U23	1	(0)
- * Club domestic league appearances and goals as of 6 October 2023

Nicholas John Fitzgerald (born 13 February 1992) is an Australian professional soccer player who plays for Sydney Olympic.

== Playing career ==
=== Club career ===
Fitzgerald grew up on Sydney's Hills Shire and played with several local clubs before playing for Blacktown City Demons in their youth teams. He was signed by the Central Coast Mariners in the A-League for their youth team, and was promoted into the senior team for their round 27 clash against Wellington Phoenix at Westpac Stadium. Central Coast would lose the game 3–0, with Fitzgerald coming on as a second-half substitute.

In July 2010, he went on loan to Queensland State League club Bundaberg Spirit to gain match time and experience. On 1 August 2011 Fitzgerald signed a two-year deal with A-League side Brisbane Roar FC after a four-week trial period.

On 14 January 2013, Fitzgerald rejoined Central Coast after a mutual decision between Brisbane and the player to return to his original club.

On 9 January 2016, Fitzgerald was released by the Mariners.

On 17 January 2016, it was announced that Fitzgerald had moved to Melbourne City for the remainder of the 2015-16 A-League season. Fitzgerald scored his first goal against Adelaide United to end the reds 14 game unbeaten run. The following week Fitzgerald scored the third goal in City's 3–1 over Brisbane Roar to send City to the top of the ladder.

On 3 May 2018, Fitzgerald was released by Melbourne City and signed with Western Sydney Wanderers.

On 24 June 2019, Fitzgerald joined Newcastle Jets on a two-year deal.

On 21 October 2020, Fitzgerald joined Indian Super League club Jamshedpur FC on a one-year deal.

In February 2022, Fitzgerald returned to Australia, signing with Perth Glory for the remainder of the 2021–22 A-League Men season.

== International career ==
On 7 March 2012 Fitzgerald was selected to represent the Australia Olympic football team in an Asian Olympic Qualifier match against Iraq.

== Honours ==
=== Club ===
Brisbane Roar

- A-League Championship: 2011–12

Central Coast Mariners

- A-League Championship: 2012–13

Melbourne City

- FFA Cup: 2016
