= 777 Partners =

Miami-based private investment firm

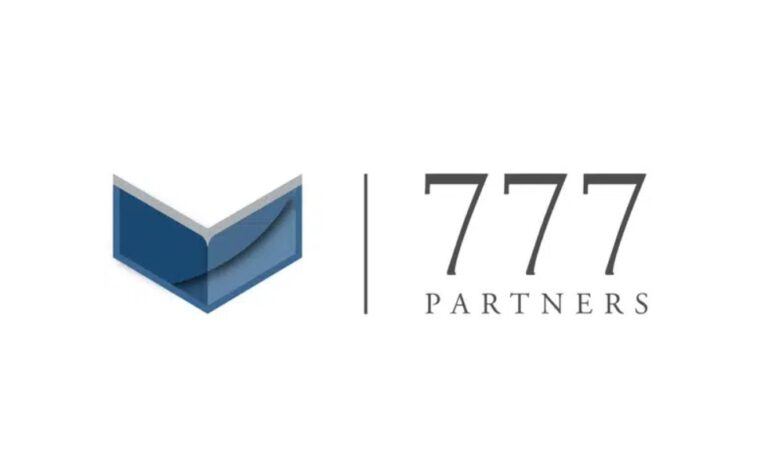

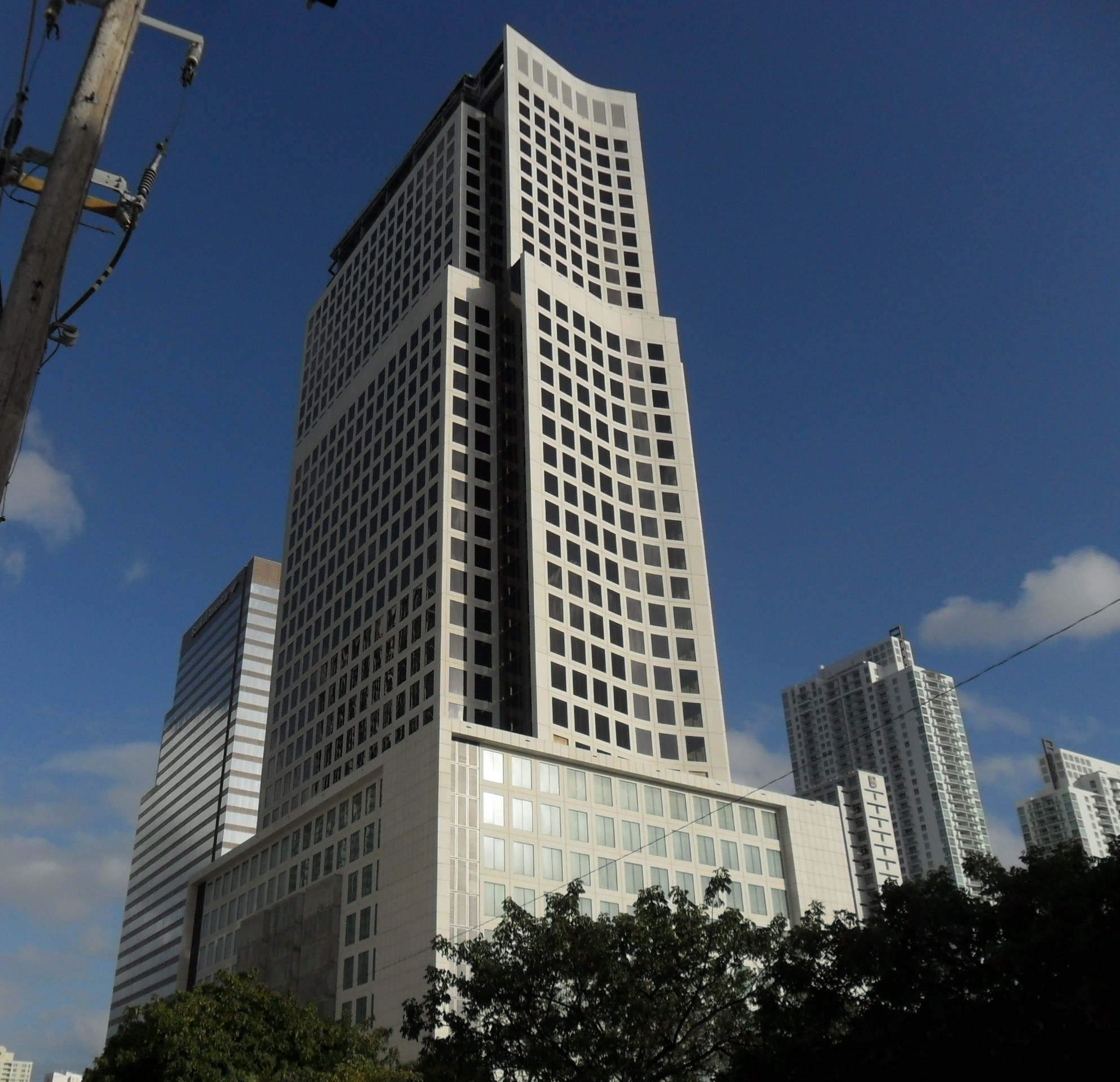
- Headquarters at Brickell World Plaza
- Type: Privately-held investment company
- Founded: September 1, 2015; 11 years ago
- Founder: Steven Pasko; Josh Wander
- Headquarters: Miami, Florida
- Number of locations: 3 (Miami, London, New York City)
- Key people: Ian Ratner (executive of B. Riley Financial, from May 6, 2024); Ronald Glass (executive of B. Riley Financial, from May 6, 2024); Steven Pasko (co-founder and former managing partner, until May 6, 2024); Josh Wander (co-founder and former managing partner, until May 6, 2024)
- Subsidiaries: Red Star FC; CR Vasco da Gama; Hertha BSC
- Website: 777part.com

777 Partners is an American private investment company based in Miami. Founded in 2015, it acquired several soccer clubs, such as Genoa CFC in Italy, Standard Liège in Belgium, Red Star FC in France, CR Vasco da Gama in Brazil, and Hertha BSC in Germany. It also has a minority stake in Spanish club Sevilla FC. The company owned the London Lions basketball team and had a large minority stakeholding in the British Basketball League (BBL). The company is also a shareholder in low-cost carrier Flair Airlines.

777 Partners has been involved in a number of legal and financial proceedings in multiple jurisdictions. In the United States and Belgium, the firm has faced civil lawsuits related to payment disputes, including a Belgian court ruling in 2023 that permitted the seizure of certain assets.

In 2024, aircraft linked to the firm were seized in Canada in connection with payment disputes. That same year, its airline Bonza entered voluntary administration, and the operating company of the British Basketball League had its license revoked by British Basketball.

In July 2024, A-CAP, an American insurance firm that invested in 777 Partners, informed several football clubs that it had assumed ownership stakes. On October 9, 2024, 777 Partners entered bankruptcy proceedings in the United Kingdom.

In August 2026, 777 Partners filed for Chapter 11 bankruptcy in an effort to eliminate the majority of its $2 billion debt.

== Soccer ==
=== Sevilla ===
777 Partners' first investment in soccer was to purchase a minority stake in Spanish La Liga club Sevilla FC in 2018. In 2020, it elevated its share to 7.5%. 777 does not legally own shares in Sevilla as its involvement is as the owner of a group called Sevillistas Unidos S.L.. The latter organization has denounced 777 for listing Sevilla as one of "Our Portfolio Brands" on its website.

Sevilla had been identified by 777 Partners as an opportunity for investment due to their focus on buying and selling players under sporting director Monchi. Their investment had been greeted with suspicion due to the club's history of being owned by local dynasties.

777 Partners' investment around Sevilla was allegedly funded in part by a loan from Oleg Boyko, a Russian businessman sanctioned by several countries for reported connections to the Russian state. In 2024, Boyko allegedly demanded 777's shares in Sevilla as collateral for his loan.

=== Genoa ===
In September 2021, 777 Partners bought 99.99% of Italian Serie A club Genoa CFC, the country's oldest club, founded in 1893. It became the sixth club in the league to have an American owner, and the transaction to buy the club from long-term owner Enrico Preziosi was estimated at €150 million. The club hired former AC Milan and Ukraine striker Andriy Shevchenko as the club manager in November, firing him in January 2022; Genoa ended the season relegated (as did another US-owned team, Venezia FC), but were immediately promoted back into the top division in May 2023.

James Horncastle wrote in May 2024 that Genoa fans were not antagonistic toward 777, partly due to a history of mismanagement by Preziosi. Horncastle mentioned that Genoa had a one-point deduction for a late tax payment in their 2022–23 Serie B promotion season.

On 18 December 2024, Genoa CFC announced that new majority stakeholder Dan Șucu, a Romanian businessman and owner of FC Rapid București and Mobexpert had taken over the club by paying €45m for 77% of the club.

The following day, A-CAP released a statement advising that they still own the club, however, the board of Genoa CFC maintains that the sale is final.

=== Vasco da Gama ===
In February 2022, 777 Partners bought 70% of CR Vasco da Gama, a Campeonato Brasileiro Série A club from Rio de Janeiro for R$700 million, valuing the club at R$1.7 billion. The transaction was the biggest in the history of Brazilian football, and came off the back of a change in legislation allowing clubs to adopt new legal structures by becoming limited companies and sourcing finance from private equity markets.

Fans protested against 777 Partners in the 2023 Campeonato Brasileiro Série A season, as the club found itself in the relegation zone. The team survived, and signed players including France international Dmitri Payet, but fans continued to protest, vandalizing the stadium in May 2024.

Within a month of taking over, Wander said that Vasco would have a comparable budget the next time they played city rivals CR Flamengo, one of the wealthiest clubs in Brazil. Plans to renovate the training complex were held up by municipal ownership of the land. After delays in payment, a local judge in May 2024 suspended the contract by which 777 Partners took over Vasco da Gama, in a preliminary ruling.

=== Standard Liège ===
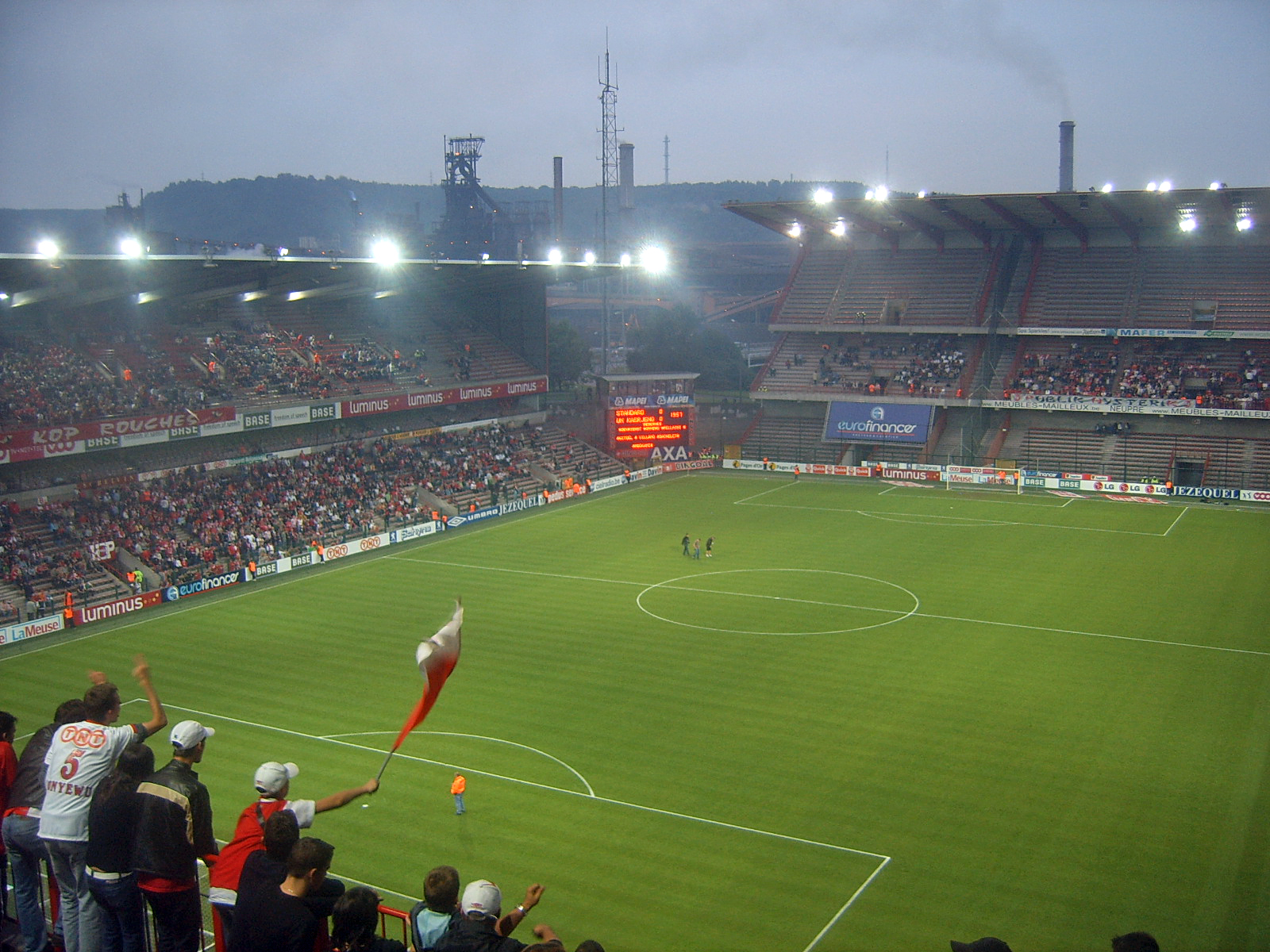
In 2024, a Belgian court ruled that 777 Partners' assets in the country could be seized, including the Stade Maurice Dufrasne.

In March 2022, 777 Partners bought 100% of Standard Liège in the Belgian Pro League for €55 million. The fans protested in September 2023 over what they believed to be a lack of investment and ambition. In December 2023, Standard Liège was given an indefinite transfer ban by national authorities for alleged delays in paying taxes, salaries and transfer fees.

In May 2024, former Standard owner Bruno Venanzi and the former owners of the club's Stade Maurice Dufrasne demanded the seizure of 777's assets in Belgium over alleged non-payment. Later that month in protest against 777, Standard fans blocked the team bus from leaving the training center before a game against Westerlo, leading to the game being postponed. A court ruled that 777's assets in Belgium could be seized.

After 777's soccer clubs passed into ownership of A-CAP, the latter put Standard up for sale in September 2024. In June 2025, the ownership transferred to Giacomo Angelini, alongside a capital increase of €28.7 million.

=== Red Star ===
777 Partners bought Red Star FC of the French third-tier Championnat National in April 2022. The club was founded in 1897 by Jules Rimet, who was later president of FIFA. The takeover was met with backlash due to the club's working-class and left-wing history, and concerns that the club would become a farm team for 777's other assets. Former presidential candidate Jean-Luc Mélenchon was one of several politicians to sign a letter published in Le Monde, stating "For us, Red Star is a common good that cannot be sacrificed on the altar of profit." Éric Coquerel, the parliamentary deputy whose constituency includes Red Star's home of Saint-Ouen-sur-Seine, has campaigned for laws against multi-club ownership. Red Star won promotion to Ligue 2 in 2024.

=== Melbourne Victory ===
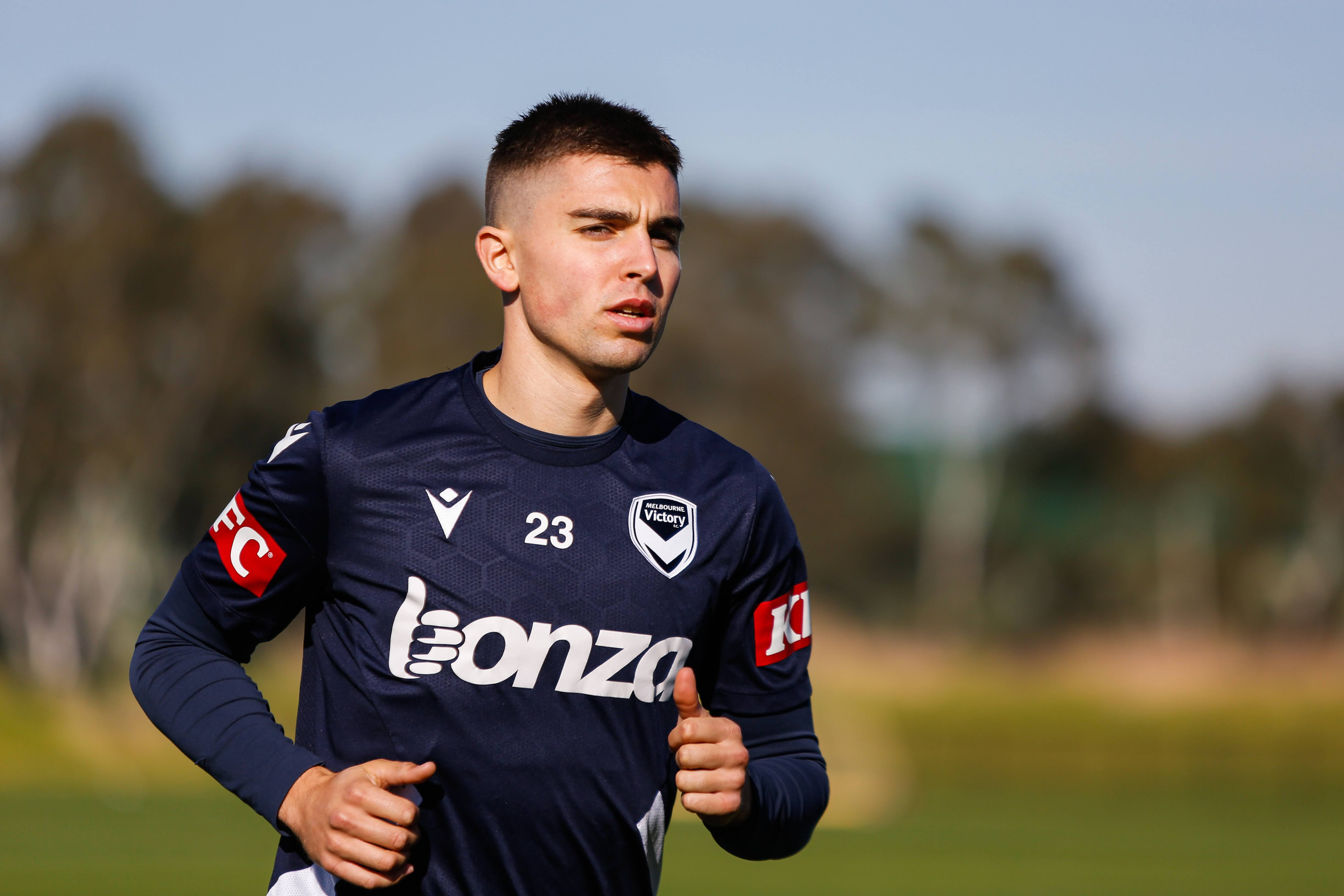
777 Partners purchased a stake in Melbourne Victory FC, sponsored by its subsidiary Bonza

In October 2022, 777 Partners bought a minority stake in Melbourne Victory FC of the Australian A-League Men for AU$8.7 million. The following January, the club's shareholders voted in favor of allowing 777 Partners to secure up to 70% over the next five years, in exchange for AU$30 million in investment.

The voluntary administration of 777 Partners' Australian airline Bonza in 2024 meant that Melbourne Victory were sponsored by AIA Group for the playoffs that year, before a long-term deal with Turkish Airlines could begin in 2025.

=== Hertha BSC ===
The company took a 64.7% stake in Hertha BSC of the German Bundesliga in March 2023, after its sale by Lars Windhorst, who had been majority shareholder since 2019. Due to German football's 50+1 rule, 777 does not control the club. The company faced protests from Hertha's fans.

In May 2024, The Athletic reported that fans were less antagonistic toward 777 at Hertha Berlin than at other clubs in their portfolio, partly due to the controversies and low points of Windhorst's ownership.

=== Everton bid ===
In September 2023, 777 Partners agreed to buy Farhad Moshiri's 94.1% shareholding in English Premier League team Everton F.C. In April 2024, with the deal not complete and after the 777-owned Australian airline Bonza entered voluntary administration, Everton called upon the services of insolvency advisers Teneo. Amid lawsuits against 777 Partners in other countries, the Everton Shareholders' Association wrote to Moshiri requesting that he terminate the deal.

777 enlisted B. Riley Financial for advice to complete the deal. According to 777's own lawyers, Wander and Pasko resigned as managers of the company on May 6, 2024, but remained as its 100% owners. On June 1, 2024, the deadline for the deal to be completed expired.

== Aviation ==
=== Flair ===
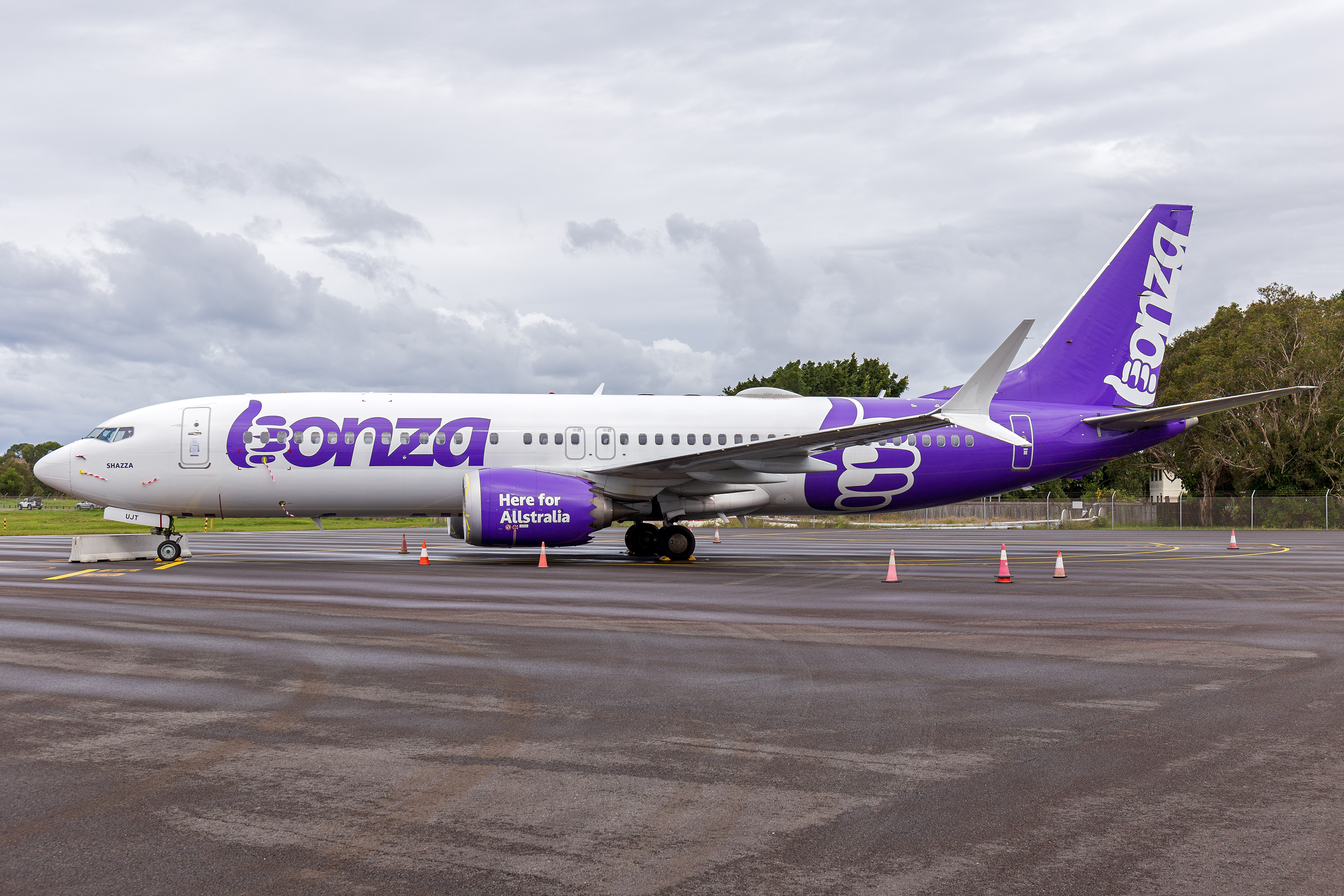
A Boeing 737 MAX 8 operated by Bonza, at Sunshine Coast Airport

777 was the owner of low-cost carrier Flair Airlines. In June 2022, the Canadian Transportation Agency ruled that Flair is a Canadian airline and can fly domestically, as 777 owns 25% of the shares and had limited its influence on the board since the beginning of the CTA investigation.

On March 11, 2023, Airborne Capital Ltd. seized four aircraft operated by Flair on leases over alleged non-payment. In a press conference, Flair CEO Stephen Jones suggested the seizures were motivated by competitors, and that the airline owed around US$1 million on the leases, and was in the process of making payment when the seizures occurred. The lessor, Airborne alleged that Flair had repeatedly missed payments amounting to several millions of dollars over a period of five months. Flair used other aircraft to continue to operate its schedule. In January 2024, it was reported that the lessors had filed claims at the UK High Court for costs and that there had been outstanding payments of $1.8 million on the four aircraft when notice of default was served.

In August 2024, interim CEO Maciej Wilk said that 777's stake in Flair was down to 10% and the company's involvement was mostly as a lender, having no presence in the boardroom.

=== Bonza ===
From October 2021 until it entered voluntary administration in April 2024, 777 Partners owned Australian airline Bonza. 777 Partners, not the airline, was responsible for the failed lease payments. Bonza's administrators made all of the airline's staff redundant in June 2024 and voted to wind up the company on July 2. The administrators said "Whilst 777 Partners did provide funding, the funding was insufficient for the level of debt incurred, which continued to increase, particularly from November 2023 to the date of our appointment."

In September 2024, the United States Department of Justice opened an investigation into 777 Partners and its investor A-CAP regarding allegations of money laundering.

== Other investments ==
In 2019, 777 Partners bought the London Lions, London's sole men's professional basketball team. They then invested £7 million for 45% of the British Basketball League (BBL). 777 sold a slight minority stake in the London Lions to O.G. Anunoby and became the first British team to ever qualify for EuroCup playoffs.

In May 2024, British Basketball revoked the license of the operating company behind the BBL, due to concerns over its financing. The BBL folded and was replaced by Super League Basketball. In August 2024, administrators Hudson Weir allowed the London Lions to be sold to Tesonet, the creators of NordVPN and owners of Lithuanian team BC Žalgiris. The new owners defended their decision to keep Lenz Balan, former vice president of 777 Partners, as CEO of the Lions.

In 2022, 777 invested in STX Entertainment, a global film studio known for producing films such as Molly's Game, The Irishman, and Ferrari.

== Controversy ==
During the negotiations to buy Vasco, Brazilian newspaper O Globo revealed that Wander had been convicted in 2004 for ordering cocaine in the mail while a 22-year-old student of the University of Florida. Facing a possible 26-year sentence, he pleaded no contest and received 15 years of probation, that ended in 2018. Wander's conviction has been brought up in the media, and in an interview with the Financial Times he called it a "stupid college thing" and a "perfect opportunity for those people that are haters to try to destroy you with things that are somewhat meaningless".

Norwegian football investigation website Josimar wrote in 2023 that 777 was facing allegations of financial impropriety, including fraud and unpaid bills. 777 condemned Josimar's article as "wholly misleading".

777 Partners have been sued by multiple organizations for unpaid debts and contract breaches with lawsuits describing their financial practices as a "house of cards" and a "sprawling fraudulent enterprise".

In May 2024, American insurance firm Advantage Capital Holdings LLC (A-CAP), a major investor in 777 Partners, hired Moelis & Company to review 777's portfolio. A-CAP's loans had been secured against 777's assets. In July, A-CAP wrote to 777 Partners' soccer clubs to inform them that it was the new owner. In October 2024, 777's UK entity was declared bankrupt by the High Court.

In August 2025, Delaware judge Christian Douglas Wright put 777 Partners into limited receivership over unpaid legal bills of nearly $600,000 for former CFO Damien Alfalla.

In October 2025, Wander was indicted in the U.S. District Court for the Southern District of New York on federal charges of conspiracy to commit wire fraud, wire fraud, conspiracy to commit securities fraud, and securities fraud. Prosecutors alleged that Wander and his associates defrauded lenders and investors of nearly $500 million through a scheme involving fabricated financial statements, doctored records, and double-pledged collateral. New allegations were made in a superseding indictment on June 30, 2026, further alleging diversion of loan funds, fabrication of financial records, and witness tampering.
