= Multi-club ownership =

Ownership of multiple clubs by a single entity

City Football Group controls ten clubs, the most of any MCO.

In association football, multi-club ownership (MCO) is a business model in which a single individual or entity holds influence in two or more football clubs, or a club over one or more other clubs. There are multiple different criterion for what makes a club a member of an MCO, but most cover decisive control or influence over a clubs' shares, governance, and/or finances. Two of the largest are City Football Group and Red Bull GmbH, who control ten and nine clubs respectively.

Since the 2000s, the structure has become increasingly common; there are an estimated 200–400 clubs involved in MCO networks, (Note: For 2023, International Centre for Sports Studies reported 195 clubs were involved in MCO models globally, SportBusiness reported 301; for 2025, Play the Game reported 400.) with the majority of clubs located in Europe and investment groups based in the United States. Across Europe, 17% of all top-division teams are involved in a multi-club network. Many sporting bodies regulate or prevent the practice, but there are concerns that current laws are growing insufficient, especially at an international level. Benefits include better player development and retention, commercial expansion, and financial returns, while the practice has raised concerns over fair competition and integrity, governance, financial manipulation, and the erosion of club identity.

== History ==
Inspired by North American sports franchise ownership, MCOs first emerged in the 1990s with investors viewing clubs as independent assets. One of the first was Italian food company Parmalat, who in the early- to mid-1990s bought Parma Calcio 1913, Paulista and Palmeiras. However, the first consortium to raise wider awareness of the practice was the English National Investment Company (now ENIC Group), who in the mid- to late-1990s acquired stakes in European teams Tottenham Hotspur, Rangers, Slavia Prague, AEK Athens, Vicenza and Basel. Three of these teams qualified for the 1997–98 UEFA Cup Winners' Cup, and AEK and Prague for the 1998–99 UEFA Cup, at which point UEFA blocked AEK from entering the competition due to their sister clubs' qualification. ENIC appealed to the Court of Arbitration for Sport (CAS), arguing that UEFA had violated EU competition law. CAS permitted AEK and Prague to compete that season on a technicality, (Note: CAS allowed the clubs "preliminary relief" from the ban on the grounds that UEFA violated good faith and procedural fairness by enacting the law too late, as UEFA cup regulations for the season had already been agreed.) but ultimately rejected ENIC's arguments. This legal battle led UEFA to formalise their MCO laws in 2001 under regulation "Article 5".

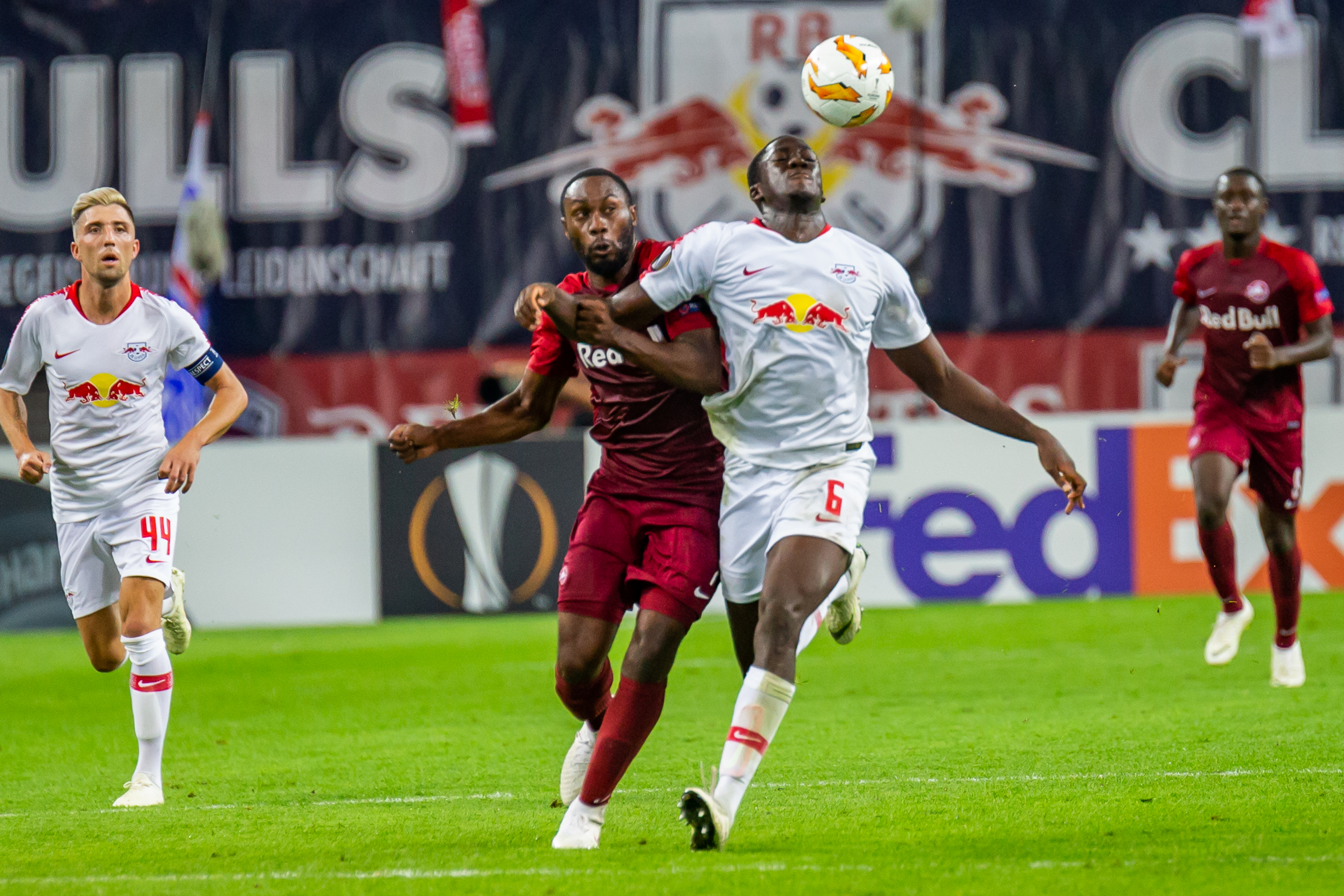
Red Bull-owned clubs RB Leipzig and Red Bull Salzburg face off in the 2018–19 UEFA Europa League.

In the 2010s, MCO networks began to become more integrated and complex as owners realised the benefits of collaborating between clubs rather than treating them independently. Changing regulations also played a role; in April 2015, FIFA banned third-party ownership of players which has been referenced as an turning point for increased MCO proliferation. In the 2012–13 Championship season, Watford reached the play-off final after signing 10 players on loan from Udinese, both of whom were owned by the Pozzo family. In response, before the 2013–14 season the English Football League voted to restrict teams to five loan players from overseas in a matchday squad. In 2016, Manchester City bought Anthony Caceres from Central Coast Mariners and immediately loaned him to A-League rivals (and City Football Group-owned) Melbourne City, in a move condemned as skirting A-League transfer rules. In response, Football Australia introduced the Caceres rule, explicitly blocking such practice.

In 2017, UEFA's MCO regulations were tested for the first time, as Red Bull GmbH-owned clubs RB Leipzig and Red Bull Salzburg both qualified for the Champions League. UEFA initially denied access, but after Salzburg made changes to loan agreements, sponsorships and board members, they reversed course and permitted both clubs to compete. UEFA also loosened their MCO regulations, now denying owners with "decisive influence" in multiple clubs, rather than the previous stricter "control or influence". Incidentally, the two Red Bull clubs later met directly in the 2018–19 Europa League group stages, with Salzburg winning both fixtures.

From 2015 to 2023, the number of MCO groups and clubs within them increased fivefold, two-thirds of clubs being based in Europe. (Note: From 2015–2023, clubs in MCOs rose from 62 to 301 and number of MCO groups rose from 25 to 124.) This caused increased regulatory issues, especially in Europe where clubs were increasingly likely to meet. In 2023, a UEFA report warned that MCOs posed "a material threat to the integrity of European club competitions". Fans started becoming increasingly aware of the practice, and multiple supporter groups staged protests against buyout into MCO groups. Ahead of the 2024–2025 season, UEFA again tweaked regulations to allow "temporary alternatives" to teams at risk of failing measures, as MCO clubs continued to meet in competitions. Instances of shared-ownership clubs competing together, moving competition, or being denied access on account of their ownership continued to become more prevalent.

MCO networks are now a mainstay of elite football, and are typified by corporate football conglomerates. In 2025, 80% of Premier League, 61% of Ligue 1, 60% of Serie A, and 17% of all European top-division teams were involved in multi-club networks. There is growing interest in investments outside of Europe; in 2024 and 2025, major acquisitions of European teams fell to 50% of the previous peak, whilst major & minor investments outside of Europe continued to accelerate. MCOs are also growing in women's football, as commercial viability is expanding quickly. Criticisms continue to grow, as fans of grow increasingly unhappy with the impacts of the model. There are concerns that current regulations are growing increasingly insufficient.

== Definition and regulations ==
Many football associations and organisational bodies have laws concerning MCOs, some for regulation and others to forbid it entirely. Additionally, there are multiple different definitions for what constitutes a club to be in an MCO network.

=== UEFA ===
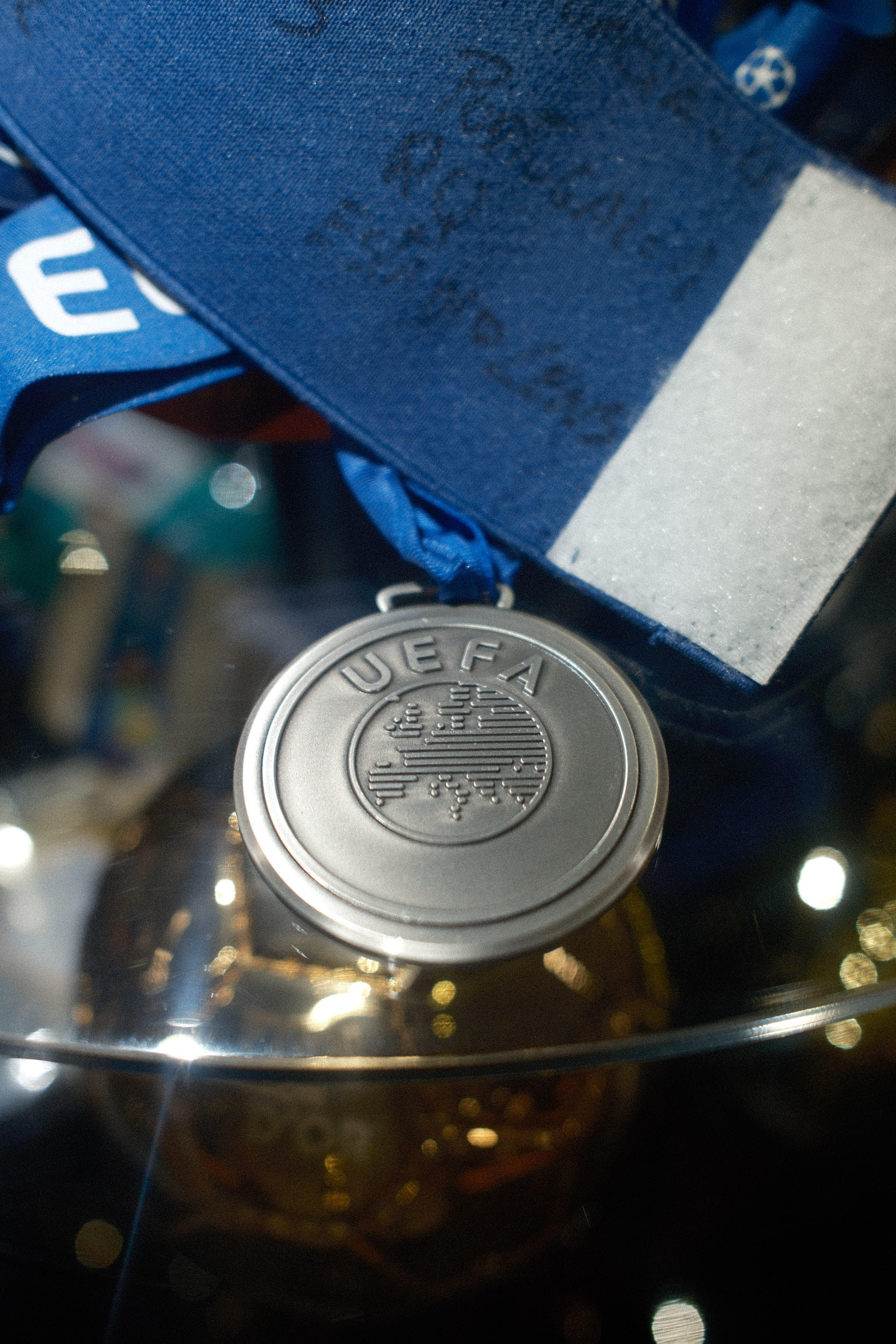
MCO clubs in the same network are increasingly competing in the same UEFA competitions.

UEFA defines MCOs as multiple clubs where an individual, legal entity, or other club has 'decisive influence', including over shares and/or voting rights (generally considered unacceptable at 30%), or in direct or indirect management, administration and/or sporting decisions. This means that a club does not need to be fully owned by an MCO group or another club to be considered as part of a network.

UEFA forbids MCO clubs from competing in the same competition under "Article 5" of their regulations. However, as the number of European MCO networks has risen, they have faced increasing difficulty in regulation. UEFA have allowed multiple MCO club pairs to compete together (including RB Leipzig and RB Salzburg in 2017; Aston Villa and Vitoria in 2023; Manchester United and OGC Nice in 2024), sometimes requiring clubs to change board members, sponsorships, loan agreements, and transfer shares to ensure regulations are complied and no one had "control or decisive influence" over both teams.

In 2024, UEFA relaxed MCO rules and introduced "temporary alternatives" to clubs at risk of failing requirements, allowing them to transfer shares into a blind trust overseen by an independent third party. This method allowed Manchester City and Girona to compete together in 2024-25 UEFA Champions League.

=== FIFA ===
FIFA mirrors UEFA's MCO definition and laws for the FIFA Club World Cup. They forbid clubs who are involved in the management, administration, or sporting performance of other clubs, or individuals with majority shares, governance or financial control of multiple clubs, from competing in the competition.

=== England ===
England's various football governing bodies all have their own definitions for MCOs, which aim to restrict ownership of multiple clubs within the country. Such ownership is regulated down to the eighth tier of the English football pyramid.

The Premier League uses the term "Significant Interest", defining it as "beneficial interest" in a club or holding 10% or more of its shares. Anyone with "Significant Interest" in a club is forbidden from holding any shares in another. Additionally, in 2021 the Premier League introduced regulations on deals between MCO clubs. Any business between a Premier League club and a third party (club or otherwise) of shared group, ownership or influence is considered an "Associated Party Transaction", which is subject to a "Fair Market Value Assessment" to ensure the value of the deal is at fair market value. If not, it has the power to require the transaction to reflect market value.

Similarly, the EFL defines the term "interest", covering shares or managerial/administrative influence. No individual or entity may have "interest" in more than one club in the EFL. Until 2025, shared ownership of Scottish Football League and Irish Football League clubs was also banned.

The FA shares the Premier League's definition of "Significant Interest", and bars any person becoming owner or director who holds "Significant Interest" in another club, where the two clubs may meet in any FA-sanctioned competition. This covers the National League North, National League South, Southern Football League, Isthmian Football League and Northern Premier League. The FA also defines "Nursery Clubs" (also referred to as feeder clubs), who have their management, finances and players controlled by another club. Nursery Clubs are not entitled to be members of the FA.

=== Germany ===
In Germany, multi-club ownership is strictly regulated down to the third tier to the point where it is effectively banned. Set by the Deutsche Fußball Liga (governing Bundesliga and 2. Bundesliga) and the German Football Association (governing 3. Bundesliga), the bodies share near-identical clauses; no one may own more than 10% of voting rights or capital in more than one team in their respective league(s), and may not own any percentage in more than three teams.

On top of this, the Deutsche Fußball Liga also enforces the 50+1 rule, stipulating that the majority (50% plus one vote) of voting shares of a club must be held by its club members. This prevents any single investor acquiring the majority of a clubs' voting rights.

=== Italy ===
In Italy, the Italian Football Federation (FIGC) regulates multi-club ownership under 'Article 16-bis', which bans ownership of more than one club in the same division. This was introduced after Salernitana's promotion to Serie A in 2021, a club owned by Claudio Lotito who also controlled Lazio. The FIGC forced Lotito to sell one of his clubs (choosing Salernitana), introduced 'Article 16-bis', and announced that all MCO entities would be banned by the start of the 2024–2025 season, regardless of division. In 2022, this deadline was extended to the 2028–2029 season.

=== Portugal ===
The Portuguese government defines MCOs using a percentage of shares owned, and heavily restricts them within the country. No one person or entity with shares in a sports club may own more than a 5% of shares in another club, who competes in the national competition of the same sport. In 2013 this figure was introduced at 10% of shares, later reduced in 2023 to 5%.

=== Spain ===
In Spain, the Spanish government restricts multi-club ownership. It defines the term "significant holding" as a 5% ownership of voting rights, shares, or other interests, and bans any club director or executive from possessing "significant holding" in another club competing in the same sport. Furthermore, any person intending to obtain 25% or more of a professional sports club must first obtain permission from the Spanish Sports Council.

== Impacts ==
=== Competitive integrity ===
As the number of clubs in MCOs rises, maintaining competitive integrity is a key concern. This is especially apparent in Europe, where the majority of MCO clubs are located; in 2023, UEFA warned that MCOs posed "a material threat to the integrity of European club competitions", in relation to shared ownership clubs competing against one another. There is also concern that networks may manipulate transfer fees or loan deals, which is seen by some as an unfair competitive advantage.

=== Club identity ===
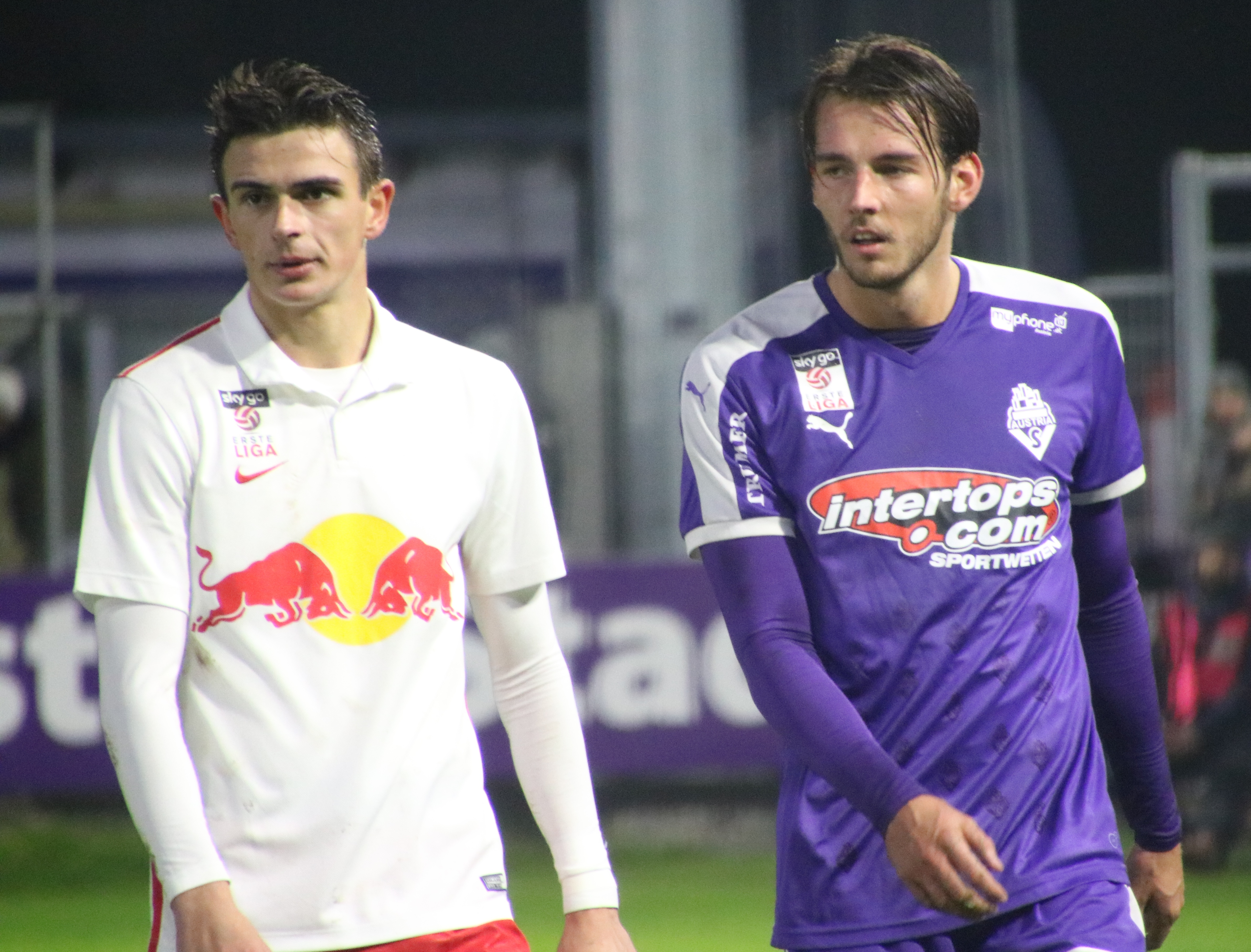
Red Bull feeder team FC Liefering play SV Austria Salzburg, who were founded in protest to Red Bull's rebranding.

Some MCO groups utilise their network to strengthen brand identity. This enables them to improve global reach across different markets, but shifts club identity away from its local communities in favour of global brand strategy. For supporters, the loss of identity is a big concern, with fan protests often centred around its preservation; research has shown that MCO clubs have significantly lower fan engagement.

Multiple clubs in the Red Bull GmbH and City Football Group umbrellas have been rebranded through changing team colours, crest, and/or name, including RB Leipzig (formerly SSV Markranstädt), Red Bull Salzburg (formerly SV Austria Salzburg), Montevideo City Torque (formerly Club Atlético Torque), and Shenzhen Peng City (formerly Sichuan Jiuniu). After Red Bull Salzburg's rebranding, some supporters of the original team founded phoenix club SV Austria Salzburg in protest.

=== Transfers ===
One of the key benefits for MCO groups is ease and flexibility of transfers and loans within their network. This can be beneficial for developing players in less competitive leagues, taking advantage of country-dependent work permit laws, or inflating, deflating, or redirecting fees to meet Financial Fair Play Regulations. MCO clubs are more likely to use internal loan deals, and to pay more for players within their network. However, in 2024 intra-group transfers and loans were rare (0.33% of all permanent moves in top five leagues) and two-thirds of MCO clubs had no trading at all within their group, indicating that few MCO groups benefit from such practice.

There are multiple examples of players joining MCO clubs and controversially moving to a different team in the network, often at the expense of the original club. (Note: Ernest Nuamah, RWD Molenbeek to Olympique Lyonnais; Mickaël Biron, AS Nancy Lorraine to KV Oostende; Alex Paulsen, Bournemouth to Auckland FC; Sávio, Troyes to PSV and Girona) Some bodies view intra-group transfers as an unfair competitive advantage and have laws to regulate or prevent them (including the Caceres rule in Australia, "Associated Party Transactions" in the Premier League). However, regulation across leagues is difficult to enforce.

=== Club performance ===
MCOs can pool resources including scouting information, operational expertise, players, and finances. Investors claim that MCOs improve sporting performance; however, research has shown that they are not associated with an improvement in league position. Instead, club success can be dependent on the priority that a network gives it. Some clubs can see benefits from pooled scouting and financial resources, but others can suffer if they are made to be a "feeder" to a "flagship" team.

Some supporter groups have staged protests against their perceived "feeder" status including RC Strasbourg and Troyes. Multiple MCO clubs have been close to bankruptcy or have folded following MCO acquisition, including KV Oostende, KMSK Deinze, Lille, Boavista and Royal Excel Mouscron.

== Types ==
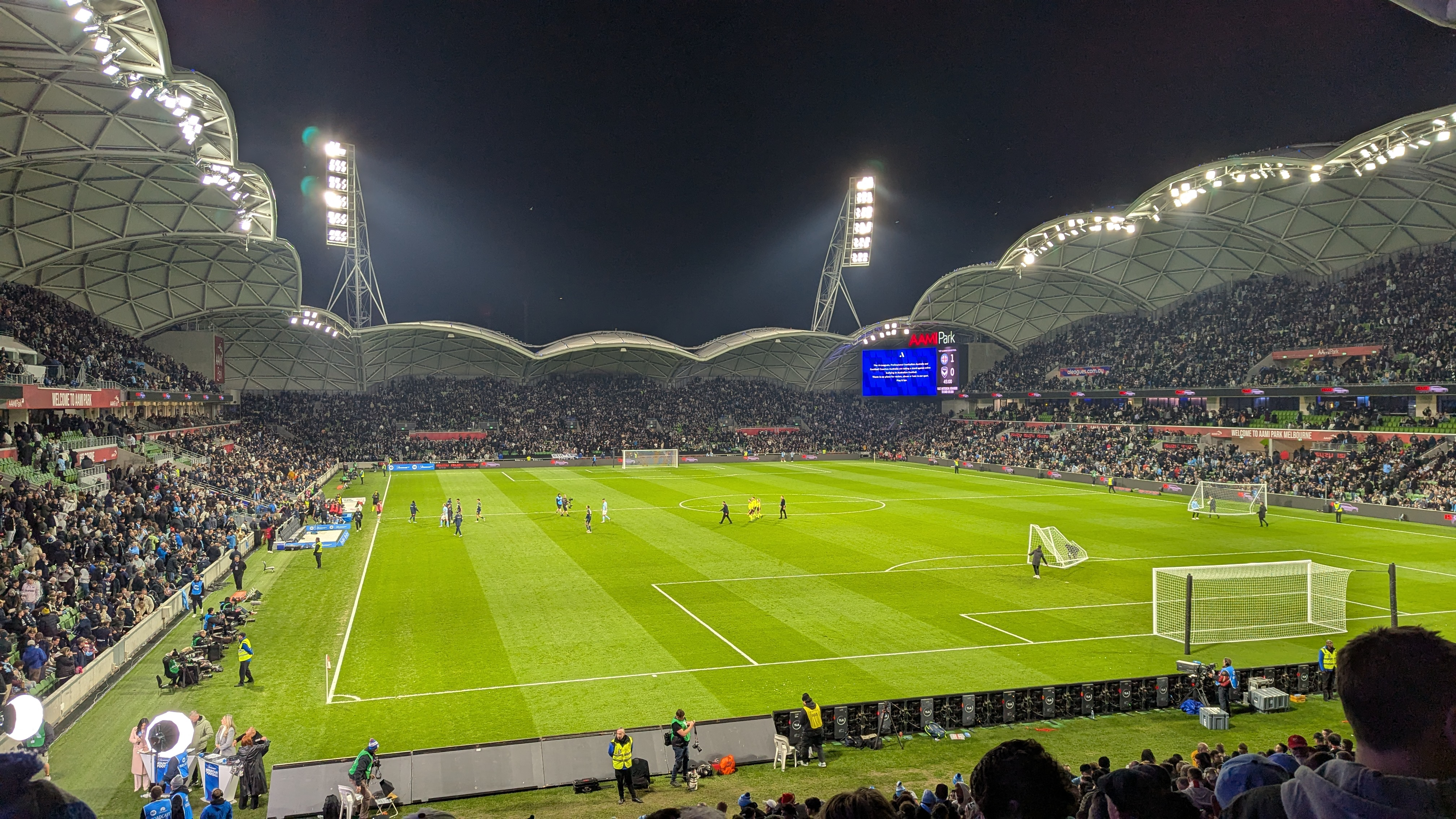
In the City Football Group, Melbourne City FC are a feeder team for Manchester City.

=== Horizontal ===
Horizontal MCOs operate with a flat structure, with all clubs operating at similar competitive levels. Scouting and operational resources may be shared between clubs, but they are often granted more autonomy with no clear hierarchy. Exchange of players is also limited. Examples of horizontal groups include A-Cap (formerly 777 Partners) and the Evangelos Marinakis Group.

=== Vertical (flagship-feeder) ===
Vertical MCOs operate with a pyramid-like structure, where one or more smaller "feeder" clubs service a main "flagship" club. Feeders will provide the Flagship with developed players or investment, and may receive younger players on loan for development. This model is often beneficial for the Flagship, but can leave the Feeders limited by their position, losing their best talent and decreased investment focus. Research has shown that Flagships perform significantly better than their Feeders.

Examples of vertical groups include City Football Group and Red Bull GmbH.

== Examples ==
As of August 2026

Owner / Ownership Group	Clubs
City Football Group	(England) Manchester City (France) Troyes (Australia) Melbourne City (Uruguay) Montevideo City Torque (United States) New York City FC (Belgium) Lommel (Italy) Palermo (Brazil) Bahia (India) Mumbai City FC (until 2025) (Spain) Girona (Japan) Yokohama F. Marinos (until 2026) (China) Shenzhen Peng City
Red Bull GmbH	(Austria) Red Bull Salzburg (Germany) RB Leipzig (Austria) FC Liefering (United States) New York Red Bulls (Brazil) Red Bull Bragantino (Brazil) Red Bull Bragantino II (lnactive as of 2024) (Japan) RB Omiya Ardija (England) Leeds United (France) Paris FC; Red Bull Ghana (until 2014)
Qatar Sports Investments	(France) Paris Saint-Germain (Belgium) KAS Eupen (Portugal) SC Braga
NewCity Capital (Chien Lee)	(France) OGC Nice (until 2019) (England) Barnsley (until 2022) (Switzerland) FC Thun (France) AS Nancy Lorraine (Belgium) KV Oostende (until 2024) (Denmark) Esbjerg fB (until 2024) (Netherlands) Den Bosch (until 2024) (Germany) Kaiserslautern (Poland) GKS Tychy
Blitzer Global Football Holdings (David Blitzer)	(Netherlands) ADO Den Haag (Spain) AD Alcorcón (Belgium) SK Beveren (Portugal) Estoril (Denmark) Brøndby IF (England) Crystal Palace
Evangelos Marinakis Football Group (Evangelos Marinakis)	(Greece) Olympiacos (England) Nottingham Forest (Portugal) Rio Ave
INEOS	(England) Manchester United (France) OGC Nice (Switzerland) Lausanne-Sport
Black Knight Football Group	(England) Bournemouth (New Zealand) Auckland FC (Portugal) Moreirense (France) Lorient
Kynisca (Michele Kang)	(United States) Washington Spirit (France) OL Lyonnes (France) Lyon (England) London City Lionesses
BlueCo	(England) Chelsea (France) Strasbourg
Kroenke Sports & Entertainment	(England) Arsenal (United States) Colorado Rapids
Tony Bloom	(England) Brighton & Hove Albion (Scotland) Heart of Midlothian (Belgium) Royale Union Saint-Gilloise (Australia) Melbourne Victory
V Sports	(England) Aston Villa (Portugal) Vitória Guimarães (Spain) Real Unión (France) FC Annecy
A-Cap (formerly 777 Partners)	(Germany) Hertha BSC (France) Red Star Paris (Belgium) Standard Liège (until 2025) (Italy) Genoa (until 2025) (Brazil) Vasco da Gama (until 2025) (Spain) Sevilla
Eagle Football Holdings (John Textor)	(France) Lyon (until 2026) (England) Crystal Palace (until 2025) (Brazil) Botafogo (until 2026) (Belgium) RWDM Brussels (until 2026) (United States) OL Reign (until 2023)
ALK Capital	(Spain) Espanyol (England) Burnley
Amber Capital	(France) Lens (Colombia) Millonarios (Spain) Real Zaragoza
Mansour Group	(United States) San Diego FC (Denmark) Nordsjælland (Egypt) FC Masar
DSM Football World	(Austria) SV Lafnitz (Hungary) Haladás Szombathely (Austria) TSV Hartberg (Czech Republic) Viktoria Pilsen
Core Sports Capital	(France) Clermont Foot (Switzerland) FC Biel; Austria Lustenau
Joe Mansueto	(United States) Chicago Fire (Switzerland) Lugano
Atlético Madrid	(Canada) Atlético Ottawa (Mexico) Atlético San Luis (India) ATK (Until 2017)
Hobra (Dietmar Hopp)	(Germany) TSG Hoffenheim (Portugal) Académico de Viseu (Brazil) Barra FC
Gérard López	(France) Lille OSC (until 2020) (France) Bordeaux (until 2026) (Portugal) Boavista (until 2026) (Belgium) Royal Excel Mouscron (until 2022)
David Beckham	(United States) Inter Miami (England) Salford City

== See also ==
- 50+1 rule – Clause requiring German clubs in the top two divisions be majority-controlled by its members.
