= 2017–18 Ligue 1 =

80th season of top-tier French football

Ligue 1
- Season: 2017–18
- Dates: 4 August 2017 – 19 May 2018
- Champions: Paris Saint-Germain; 7th Ligue 1 title 7th French title
- Relegated: Troyes; Metz
- Champions League: Paris Saint-Germain; Monaco; Lyon
- Europa League: Marseille; Rennes; Bordeaux
- Matches: 380
- Goals: 1,033 (2.72 per match)
- Top goalscorer: Edinson Cavani (28 goals)
- Biggest home win: Paris Saint-Germain 8–0 Dijon (17 January 2018)
- Biggest away win: Troyes 0–5 Lyon (22 October 2017); Angers 0–5 Paris Saint-Germain (4 November 2017); Saint-Étienne 0–5 Lyon (5 November 2017); Nice 0–5 Lyon (26 November 2017); Metz 0–5 Lyon (8 April 2018)
- Highest scoring: Marseille 6–3 Metz (2 February 2018)
- Longest winning run: 9 matches Paris Saint-Germain
- Longest unbeaten run: 17 matches Monaco
- Longest winless run: 11 matches Lille; Metz; Strasbourg
- Longest losing run: 6 matches Metz
- Highest attendance: 60,410; Marseille 2–2 Paris Saint-Germain (22 October 2017)
- Lowest attendance: 6,333; Monaco 3–1 Metz (21 January 2018)
- Total attendance: 8,559,659
- Average attendance: 22,585

The 2017–18 Ligue 1 season, also known as Ligue 1 Conforama for sponsorship reasons, was the 80th season since its establishment. The season started on 4 August 2017 and ended on 19 May 2018. Monaco were the defending champions.

On 15 April, Paris Saint-Germain won their seventh Ligue 1 title with five games to spare following a 7–1 victory over Monaco.

== Teams ==
Twenty teams competed in the league, with three promoted teams from Ligue 2: Strasbourg (Ligue 2 champions, after a nine-year absence), Amiens (Ligue 2 runner-up, their first ever Ligue 1) and Troyes (winner of the relegation play-off against Lorient, with immediate return), replacing the three relegated teams from the 2016–17 Ligue 1 season: Bastia (finished 20th, after five years), Nancy (finished 19th, with immediate return) and Lorient (lost the relegation play-off against Troyes, after 11 years). This season was also the first since the 2010-11 season to not feature a team from the island of Corsica.

=== Stadia and locations ===
Location of teams in 2017–18 Ligue 1

Club	Location	Venue	Capacity
Amiens	Amiens	Stade de la Licorne	12,097
Angers	Angers	Stade Raymond Kopa	17,835
Bordeaux	Bordeaux	Matmut Atlantique	42,115
Caen	Caen	Stade Michel d'Ornano	20,453
Dijon	Dijon	Stade Gaston Gérard	18,376
Guingamp	Guingamp	Stade du Roudourou	18,378
Lille	Villeneuve-d'Ascq	Stade Pierre-Mauroy	50,157
Lyon	Décines-Charpieu	Groupama Stadium	59,186
Marseille	Marseille	Orange Vélodrome	67,394
Metz	Metz	Stade Saint-Symphorien	25,636
Monaco	Monaco	Stade Louis II	18,523
Montpellier	Montpellier	Stade de la Mosson	32,939
Nantes	Nantes	Stade de la Beaujoire	37,473
Nice	Nice	Allianz Riviera	35,624
Paris Saint-Germain	Paris	Parc des Princes	48,583
Rennes	Rennes	Roazhon Park	29,778
Saint-Étienne	Saint-Étienne	Stade Geoffroy-Guichard	41,965
Strasbourg	Strasbourg	Stade de la Meinau	29,230
Toulouse	Toulouse	Stadium Municipal	33,150
Troyes	Troyes	Stade de l'Aube	20,420

=== Personnel and kits ===
Team	Manager	Captain	Kit manufacturer	Shirt sponsors (front)	Shirt sponsors (back)	Shirt sponsors (sleeve)	Shorts sponsors	Socks sponsors
Amiens	(France) Christophe Pélissier	(France) Thomas Monconduit	Adidas	Intersport, No Publik, CG2I	IGOL Lubrifiants	Teddy Smith	Amiens Métropole	None
Angers	(France) Stéphane Moulin	(Ivory Coast) Ismaël Traoré	Kappa	Scania (H)/Le Gaulois (A), L'Atoll Angers, Brioche Pasquier, Système U, Angers	La Boucherie	Algimouss	Winamax	None
Bordeaux	(Uruguay) Gus Poyet	(Czech Republic) Jaroslav Plašil	Puma	Groupe Sweetcom (H)/Bistro Régent (A)/Winamax (3), Avenue de la Glisse/Intersport	Bistro Régent (H)/Groupe Sweetcom (A)	Wiśniowski	Winamax, Pitaya Thai	None
Caen	(France) Patrice Garande	(France) Julien Féret	Umbro	Campagne de France (H)/Maisons France Confort (A & 3), Künkel, Groupe IDEC	SOS Malus	Alticap	Petit Forestier	None
Dijon	(France) Olivier Dall'Oglio	(France) Cédric Varrault	Lotto	Groupe Roger Martin (H)/Suez (A & 3), Incendie Protection Sécurité, DVF Group, Dijon Métropole (H)/Groupe Roger Martin (A)	DORAS	Leader Interim, Auteur des Williams, Coup d'Pouce	Engie, Dalkia	Caisse d'Épargne
Guingamp	(New Caledonia) Antoine Kombouaré	(France) Jimmy Briand	Patrick	Servagroupe, Société ADS, Breizh Cola	Rapidoprêt	Union d'Experts	Cre'actuel	None
Lille	(France) Christophe Galtier	(Cameroon) Ibrahim Amadou	New Balance	Partouche	None	Boulanger	No Publik	None
Lyon	(France) Bruno Génésio	(France) Nabil Fekir	Adidas	Hyundai/Hyundai Kona/Veolia (in UEFA matches), Groupama, MDA Electroménager	ALILA Promoteur	ALILA Promoteur/Sport dans la Ville	Intermarché	None
Marseille	(France) Rudi Garcia	(France) Dimitri Payet	Adidas	Orange	Boulanger	Mutuelles du Soleil	Winamax	None
Metz	(France) Frédéric Hantz	(Serbia) Milan Biševac	Nike	Car Avenue, Moselle, Société Parisienne pour l'Industrie Électrique, Inter-Conseil Intérim	Bigben Interactive	None	E.Leclerc Moselle	None
Monaco	(Portugal) Leonardo Jardim	(Colombia) Radamel Falcao	Nike	Fedcom	None	Triangle Intérim	Orezza	None
Montpellier	(Armenia) Michel Der Zakarian	(Brazil) Vitorino Hilton	Nike	Sud de France, Dyneff Gaz, Montpellier Métropole, Mutuelles du Soleil	IDEC Sport	FAUN-Environnement	Système U, Groupe Ilios	None
Nantes	(Italy) Claudio Ranieri	(France) Léo Dubois	Umbro	Synergie, Manitou, Proginov	Anvolia	LNA Santé	Winamax, Flamino	None
Nice	(Switzerland) Lucien Favre	(Brazil) Dante	Macron	Mutuelles du Soleil/7天酒店 (in UEFA matches), Ville de Nice, Métropole Nice Côte d'Azur	Ubaldi.com	7天酒店	Winamax	None
Paris Saint-Germain	(Spain) Unai Emery	(Brazil) Thiago Silva	Nike	Fly Emirates	Ooredoo	QNB	None	None
Rennes	(France) Sabri Lamouchi	(France) Romain Danzé	Puma	Samsic, Del Arte, Armor-Lux, Association ELA	Blot Immobilier	rennes.fr	Convivio	None
Saint-Étienne	(France) Jean-Louis Gasset	(France) Loïc Perrin	Le Coq Sportif	EoviMcd Mutuelle, Loire, NetBet	Groupe Sweetcom	MARKAL	Desjoyaux Piscines	None
Strasbourg	(France) Thierry Laurey	(France) Ernest Seka	Hummel	ÉS Énergies (H)/CroisiEurope (A & 3), Hager, Pierre Schmidt (H)/Stoeffler (A)	CroisiEurope (H)/ÉS Énergies (A)	Würth	Severin France, Eurométropole de Strasbourg	None
Toulouse	(France) Mickaël Debève	(France) Christopher Jullien	Joma	Triangle Intérim, LP Promotion	Newrest	Prévoir Assurances	Mairie de Toulouse, Conseil départemental de la Haute-Garonne	None
Troyes	(France) Jean-Louis Garcia	(France) Benjamin Nivet	Kappa	Babeau Seguin, norelem, Les Mousquetaires, Festilight	Premium Automobiles Troyes	None	Troyes, Piscines Dugain	PiLeJe

=== Managerial changes ===
Team	Outgoing manager	Manner of departure	Date of vacancy	Position in table	Incoming manager	Date of appointment
Saint-Étienne	(France) Christophe Galtier	Resigned	20 May 2017	Pre-season	(Spain) Óscar García	15 June 2017
Lille	(France) Franck Passi	End of interim	20 May 2017	Pre-season	(Argentina) Marcelo Bielsa	30 June 2017
Montpellier	(France) Jean-Louis Gasset	End of contract	20 May 2017	Pre-season	(Armenia) Michel Der Zakarian	23 May 2017
Nantes	(Portugal) Sérgio Conceição	Resigned to join Porto	6 June 2017	Pre-season	(Italy) Claudio Ranieri	13 June 2017
Metz	(France) Philippe Hinschberger	Sacked	22 October 2017	20th	(France) Frédéric Hantz	29 October 2017
Rennes	(France) Christian Gourcuff	Sacked	8 November 2017	10th	(France) Sabri Lamouchi	8 November 2017
Saint-Étienne	(Spain) Óscar García	Resigned	15 November 2017	6th	(France) Julien Sablé	15 November 2017
Lille	(Argentina) Marcelo Bielsa	Sacked	15 December 2017	18th	(France) Christophe Galtier	29 December 2017
Saint-Étienne	(France) Julien Sablé	Sacked	20 December 2017	16th	(France) Jean-Louis Gasset	20 December 2017
Bordeaux	(France) Jocelyn Gourvennec	Sacked	18 January 2018	13th	(Uruguay) Gus Poyet	20 January 2018
Toulouse	(France) Pascal Dupraz	Sacked	22 January 2018	19th	(France) Mickaël Debève	22 January 2018

== League table ==
Pos	Team	Pld	W	D	L	GF	GA	GD	Pts	Qualification or relegation
1	Paris Saint-Germain (C)	38	29	6	3	108	29	+79	93	Qualification for the Champions League group stage
2	Monaco	38	24	8	6	85	45	+40	80	Qualification for the Champions League group stage
3	Lyon	38	23	9	6	87	43	+44	78	Qualification for the Champions League group stage
4	Marseille	38	22	11	5	80	47	+33	77	Qualification for the Europa League group stage (Note: Since the winners of the 2017–18 Coupe de France and the 2017–18 Coupe de la Ligue, Paris Saint-Germain, qualified for European competition based on league position, the spot awarded to the Coupe de France winners (Europa League group stage) was passed to the fourth-placed team and the spot awarded to the Coupe de la Ligue winners (Europa League third qualifying round) was passed to the sixth-placed team. The fifth-placed team received the spot in Europa League third qualifying round originally designated to the fourth-placed team.)
5	Rennes	38	16	10	12	50	44	+6	58	Qualification for the Europa League group stage
6	Bordeaux	38	16	7	15	53	48	+5	55	Qualification for the Europa League second qualifying round
7	Saint-Étienne	38	15	10	13	47	50	−3	55	
8	Nice	38	15	9	14	53	52	+1	54	
9	Nantes	38	14	10	14	36	41	−5	52	
10	Montpellier	38	11	18	9	36	33	+3	51	
11	Dijon	38	13	9	16	55	73	−18	48	
12	Guingamp	38	12	11	15	48	59	−11	47	
13	Amiens	38	12	9	17	37	42	−5	45	
14	Angers	38	9	14	15	42	52	−10	41	
15	Strasbourg	38	9	11	18	44	67	−23	38	
16	Caen	38	10	8	20	27	52	−25	38	
17	Lille	38	10	8	20	41	67	−26	38	
18	Toulouse (O)	38	9	10	19	38	54	−16	37	Qualification for the relegation play-off final
19	Troyes (R)	38	9	6	23	32	59	−27	33	Relegation to Ligue 2
20	Metz (R)	38	6	8	24	34	76	−42	26	Relegation to Ligue 2

Source: Ligue 1 and Soccerway
Rules for classification: 1) Points; 2) Goal difference; 3) Head-to-head points; 4) Head-to-head goal difference; 5) Head-to-head goals scored; 6) Head-to-head away goals; 7) Goals scored; 8) Away goals scored; 9) Most goals scored in one league match; 10) Fair-play points
(C) Champions; (O) Play-off winners; (R) Relegated

== Results ==
Home \ Away	AMI	ANG	BOR	SMC	DIJ	GUI	LIL	OL	OM	MET	ASM	MHS	FCN	NIC	PSG	REN	STE	STR	TFC	TRO
Amiens	—	0–2	1–0	3–0	2–1	3–1	3–0	1–2	0–2	2–0	1–1	1–1	0–1	3–0	2–2	0–2	0–2	3–1	0–0	1–1
Angers	1–0	—	2–2	3–0	2–1	3–0	1–1	3–3	1–1	0–1	0–4	1–1	0–2	1–1	0–5	1–2	0–1	1–1	0–1	3–1
Bordeaux	3–2	0–0	—	0–2	3–1	3–1	2–1	3–1	1–1	2–0	0–2	0–2	1–1	0–0	0–1	0–2	3–0	0–3	4–2	2–1
Caen	1–0	0–2	1–0	—	2–1	0–0	0–1	1–2	0–2	1–0	1–2	1–3	3–2	1–1	0–0	2–2	0–1	2–0	0–0	1–0
Dijon	1–1	2–1	3–2	2–0	—	3–1	3–0	2–5	1–3	1–1	1–4	2–1	1–0	3–2	1–2	2–1	0–1	1–1	3–1	3–1
Guingamp	1–1	1–1	2–1	0–0	4–0	—	1–0	0–2	3–3	2–2	3–1	0–0	0–3	2–5	0–3	2–0	2–1	2–0	1–1	4–0
Lille	0–1	1–2	0–0	0–2	2–1	2–2	—	2–2	0–1	3–1	0–4	1–1	3–0	1–1	0–3	1–2	3–1	2–1	1–0	2–2
Lyon	3–0	1–1	3–3	1–0	3–3	2–1	1–2	—	2–0	2–0	3–2	0–0	2–0	3–2	2–1	0–2	1–1	4–0	2–0	3–0
Marseille	2–1	1–1	1–0	5–0	3–0	1–0	5–1	2–3	—	6–3	2–2	0–0	1–1	2–1	2–2	1–3	3–0	2–0	2–0	3–1
Metz	0–2	1–2	0–4	1–1	1–2	1–3	0–3	0–5	0–3	—	0–1	0–1	1–1	2–1	1–5	1–1	3–0	3–0	1–1	0–1
Monaco	0–0	1–0	2–1	2–0	4–0	6–0	2–1	3–2	6–1	3–1	—	1–1	2–1	2–2	1–2	2–1	1–0	3–0	3–2	3–2
Montpellier	1–1	2–1	1–3	1–0	2–2	1–1	3–0	1–1	1–1	1–3	0–0	—	0–1	2–0	0–0	0–1	0–1	1–1	2–1	1–1
Nantes	0–1	1–0	0–1	1–0	1–1	2–1	2–2	0–0	0–1	1–0	1–0	0–2	—	1–2	0–1	1–1	0–3	1–0	2–1	1–0
Nice	1–0	2–2	1–0	4–1	1–0	2–0	2–1	0–5	2–4	3–1	4–0	1–0	1–1	—	1–2	1–1	1–0	1–2	0–1	1–2
Paris SG	2–0	2–1	6–2	3–1	8–0	2–2	3–1	2–0	3–0	5–0	7–1	4–0	4–1	3–0	—	0–2	3–0	5–2	6–2	2–0
Rennes	2–0	1–0	1–0	0–1	2–2	0–1	1–0	1–2	0–3	1–2	1–1	1–1	2–1	0–1	1–4	—	1–1	2–1	2–1	2–0
Saint-Étienne	3–0	1–1	1–3	2–1	2–2	2–0	5–0	0–5	2–2	3–1	0–4	0–1	1–1	1–0	1–1	2–2	—	2–2	2–0	2–1
Strasbourg	0–1	2–2	0–2	0–0	3–2	0–2	3–0	3–2	3–3	2–2	1–3	0–0	1–2	1–1	2–1	2–1	0–1	—	2–1	2–1
Toulouse	1–0	2–0	0–1	2–0	0–1	2–1	2–3	1–2	1–2	0–0	3–3	1–0	1–1	1–2	0–1	3–2	0–0	2–2	—	1–0
Troyes	1–0	3–0	0–1	3–1	0–0	0–1	1–0	0–5	2–3	1–0	0–3	0–1	0–1	0–2	0–2	1–1	2–1	3–0	0–0	—

Source: Ligue 1
Legend: Blue = home team win; Yellow = draw; Red = away team win.
For upcoming matches, an "a" indicates there is an article about the rivalry between the two participants.

== Relegation play-offs ==
The 2017–18 season ended with a relegation play-off between the 18th-placed Ligue 1 team, Toulouse, and the winner of the semifinal of the Ligue 2 play-off, Ajaccio, on a two-legged confrontation.

The first match, which was supposed to be held in Ajaccio, took place behind closed doors in Montpellier.

23 May 2018
20:45 CEST

Ajaccio	0–3	Toulouse
	Report	Gradel 45+3'; Jullien 51'; Sanogo 65'

Stade de la Mosson, Montpellier
Attendance: 0
Referee: Ruddy Buquet

27 May 2018
21:00 CEST

Toulouse	1–0	Ajaccio
Durmaz 88'	Report

Stadium Municipal, Toulouse
Attendance: 16,519
Referee: Benoît Bastien

Toulouse won 4–0 on aggregate and therefore both clubs remained in their respective leagues.

== Season statistics ==
=== Top goalscorers ===
Rank	Player	Club	Goals
1	(Uruguay) Edinson Cavani	Paris Saint-Germain	28
2	(France) Florian Thauvin	Marseille	22
3	(Netherlands) Memphis Depay	Lyon	19
3	(Brazil) Neymar	Paris Saint-Germain	19
5	(Italy) Mario Balotelli	Nice	18
5	(Colombia) Radamel Falcao	Monaco	18
5	(France) Nabil Fekir	Lyon	18
5	(Dominican Republic) Mariano Díaz	Lyon	18
9	(Cameroon) Karl Toko Ekambi	Angers	17
10	(France) Alassane Pléa	Nice	16

=== Hat-tricks ===
Player	Club	Against	Result	Date
(Colombia) Radamel Falcao	Monaco	Dijon	4–1 (A)	13 August 2017
(Netherlands) Memphis Depay	Lyon	Troyes	5–0 (A)	22 October 2017
(Brazil) Neymar^{4}	Paris Saint-Germain	Dijon	8–0 (H)	17 January 2018
(France) Florian Thauvin	Marseille	Metz	6–3 (H)	2 February 2018
(France) Alassane Pléa^{4}	Nice	Guingamp	5–2 (A)	11 March 2018
(France) Romain Hamouma	Saint-Étienne	Lille	5–0 (H)	19 May 2018
(Netherlands) Memphis Depay	Lyon	Nice	3–2 (H)	19 May 2018

Note

^{4} Player scored 4 goals

=== Clean sheets ===
Rank	Player	Club	Clean sheets
1	(France) Alphonse Areola	Paris Saint-Germain	17
2	(France) Benjamin Lecomte	Montpellier	14
2	(Portugal) Anthony Lopes	Lyon	14
4	(France) Alban Lafont	Toulouse	12
4	(France) Stéphane Ruffier	Saint-Étienne	12
4	(Romania) Ciprian Tătărușanu	Nantes	12
7	(France) Régis Gurtner	Amiens	11
7	(Sweden) Karl-Johan Johnsson	Guingamp	11
7	(France) Steve Mandanda	Marseille	11
7	(France) Rémy Vercoutre	Caen	11

== Awards ==
Award	Winner	Club
Player of the Season	(Brazil) Neymar	Paris Saint-Germain
Young Player of the Season	(France) Kylian Mbappé	Paris Saint-Germain
Goalkeeper of the Season	(France) Steve Mandanda	Marseille
Goal of the Season	(Brazil) Malcom	Bordeaux
Manager of the Season	(Spain) Unai Emery	Paris Saint-Germain

Team of the Year
Goalkeeper	(France) Steve Mandanda (Marseille)			
Defenders	(Brazil) Dani Alves (Paris Saint-Germain)	(Brazil) Marquinhos (Paris Saint-Germain)	(Brazil) Thiago Silva (Paris Saint-Germain)	(France) Ferland Mendy (Lyon)
Midfielders	(Italy) Marco Verratti (Paris Saint-Germain)	(Brazil) Luiz Gustavo (Marseille)		(France) Nabil Fekir (Lyon)
Forwards	(France) Kylian Mbappé (Paris Saint-Germain)	(Uruguay) Edinson Cavani (Paris Saint-Germain)		(Brazil) Neymar (Paris Saint-Germain)

== Attendances ==
#	Football club	Home games	Average attendance
1	Paris Saint-Germain	19	46,929
2	Olympique de Marseille	19	46,040
3	Olympique lyonnais	19	46,005
4	Lille OSC	19	31,453
5	AS Saint-Étienne	19	28,142
6	Girondins de Bordeaux	19	26,470
7	FC Nantes	19	24,559
8	RC Strasbourg	19	24,083
9	Stade rennais	19	23,111
10	OGC Nice	19	22,876
11	SM Caen	19	17,188
12	Toulouse FC	19	16,924
13	FC Metz	19	14,839
14	EA Guingamp	19	14,506
15	Montpellier HSC	19	13,458
16	Dijon FCO	19	12,228
17	ESTAC	19	12,196
18	Angers SCO	19	11,062
19	Amiens SC	19	9,644
20	AS Monaco	19	9,243
