= Football club (association football) =

Sports entity that participates in association football games and competitions

In association football, a football club (or association football club, alternatively soccer club) is a sports club that acts as an entity through which association football teams organise their sporting activities. The club can exist either as an independent unit or as part of a larger sports organization, as a subsidiary of the parent club or organization.

The sport of association football allows teams that partake in some sort of club activity to participate in tournaments such as leagues and other competitions. Teams must register their players, as well as staff and other personnel, to be eligible to represent the club in any activity in regard to association football competitions.

== Club competitions ==
In association football terminology, competitions are referred to as "club competitions". Supporters may also acquire membership rights within their club. Even sponsors may be accounted as members of a club. This is a reason as to why the sport came to be called association football. The exact requirements for club licensing are regulated by FIFA and implemented on a national level within each national member association.

The majority of association football clubs take part in a league system. These league systems are governed at the continental level by the six regional FIFA confederations. Football clubs exist all over the world on the amateur, semi-professional, or professional levels of the game. They can be owned by members as well as business entities.

== History ==
Football clubs have been in existence since the 1850s. During the early 1860s, there were increasing attempts in England to unify and reconcile the various football games that were played in the public schools, as well in the industrial north, under the Sheffield Rules. Working class, industrial cities all over the U.K. began forming their own football associations in the late 1800s, from the Scottish Football Association in 1873 to Lancashire FA in 1878. Other teams came into existence, some with the help of the Church: for example, Aston Villa was founded in 1874, Wolverhampton Wanderers in 1877, Bolton Wanderers in 1874, and Everton in 1878.

== Professional football clubs ==
Due to the scope and popularity of the sport, professional football clubs have significant commercial opportunities, with fans expecting personal service and interactivity, and external stakeholders viewing the field of professional football as a source of significant business advantages. For this reason, expensive player transfers have become an expected part of the sport. Awards are handed out to managers or coaches on a yearly basis for excellent performances.

The designs, logos, and names of professional football clubs are often licensed trademarks. The difference between a football team and a (professional) football club is incorporation. A football club is an entity that is formed and governed by a committee and has a membership that may consist of supporters in addition to players.

A consequence of the FIFA rules and regulations for association football clubs is that players are not allowed to be owned by any legal entity other than the clubs themselves. This means that the involvement of external investors in acquiring players for the club must only involve the eventual transfer of the contracted rights to the player in question, and not the contract itself.

=== Ownership ===
Professional football clubs often separate their traditional member-association roots from commercial operations through distinct legal forms. In many European leagues, the original club (a not-for-profit member association) retains influence over the professional team, which is operated via a limited-liability company to facilitate investment and compliance with licensing rules. A prominent example is Germany's 50+1 rule, introduced by the Deutsche Fußball Liga (DFL) in 1998. Under this regulation, the parent club (typically an eingetragener Verein or registered member association) must hold at least 50% plus one vote in the professional football company (such as a GmbH or AG), ensuring members retain majority control. This prevents external investors from dominating decisions and has been credited with maintaining lower debt levels, affordable ticket prices, and high attendances relative to other leagues. Limited exceptions exist for clubs with pre-existing corporate ties (e.g., Bayer Leverkusen and VfL Wolfsburg) or long-term investors meeting specific criteria.

In Spain, Law 10/1990 on Sport requires most professional clubs to convert from member associations into Sociedades Anónimas Deportivas (SADs, public limited sports companies) to enhance financial transparency and management. There are exceptions for longstanding member-owned clubs such as Real Madrid and FC Barcelona.

In Saudi Arabia, there is no income tax on earnings from employment in football teams.

By comparison, most English professional clubs operate directly as private companies owned by shareholders, which are often private investors or holding companies, with the English Premier League itself owned collectively by its 20 member clubs. These variations are subject to national licensing requirements under FIFA's Club Licensing Regulations, which emphasize governance, financial stability, and legal clarity regardless of ownership model.

=== Administration ===
A professional football club signs commercial contract with players as well as non-playing personnel. As with any business entity it has its own secretary or secretarial department as well as financial, legal, accounting, and other departments. The club also often has a public affairs department for promoting the club and interacting with the public on behalf of the club. The club may also have its own agronomist or whole agricultural department. It often provides medical support, such as providing first aid and continuing physical rehabilitation or recovery to its players.

=== Economics ===
There are several professional football clubs that are publicly traded. Normally, football clubs are not run to maximize profits, as sports outcomes are considered more important than financial outcomes to its ownership. In addition, financial regulations, such as UEFA Financial Fair Play, may also limit what a club is allowed to do regarding their capital and expenses.

The capital structure of a football club most closely resembles that of a nonprofit corporation, although it may still be profitable per se to its investors. A notable example is the fact that clubs may deliberately price matchday tickets below market value, instead favouring a higher stadium attendance, or membership priority access, over total matchday revenues. Another notable example is the prevalence of community initiatives by professional football clubs.

==== Markets ====
Professional football clubs also act as market entities offering a highly sought after product to an entertainment sector audience. It therefore acts as a market intermediator between its product (the football players) and its market (the supporters). In doing so, it plays a role within a certain geographic area where football is a natural part of the culture. Football clubs may also expand their reach further that their local region of origin.

== Youth systems ==
Many association football clubs will have either one or more youth systems connected to the organization, either as part of the club, or as an affiliate. The more prestigious football clubs often have a combination of their own youth academies, as well as external sources of talent (pools) through affiliated clubs, as well as the arrangement of youth tournaments.

== Stadiums ==
An association football club normally has a designated stadium as their home ground, where the club plays its home games, which normally make up about half the schedule for a given season. The home ground can be either owned by the club itself or by some other entity, such as a business, city, or district. Clubs often are the sole event organisers of their home games.

Stadium naming rights are sometimes procured by sponsors to generate additional sources of revenue for the football club. Normally this requires the club (or its owners) to have sole ownership of the stadium.

== See also ==
- Football team
- Lists of association football clubs
- List of women's association football clubs
- Association football club names
- Association football tactics
- Forbes list of the most valuable football clubs
- Forbes list of the most valuable sports teams
- FIFA
- 50+1 rule
- Football club (East Germany)
