= Chien Lee =

Chinese American entrepreneur and investor

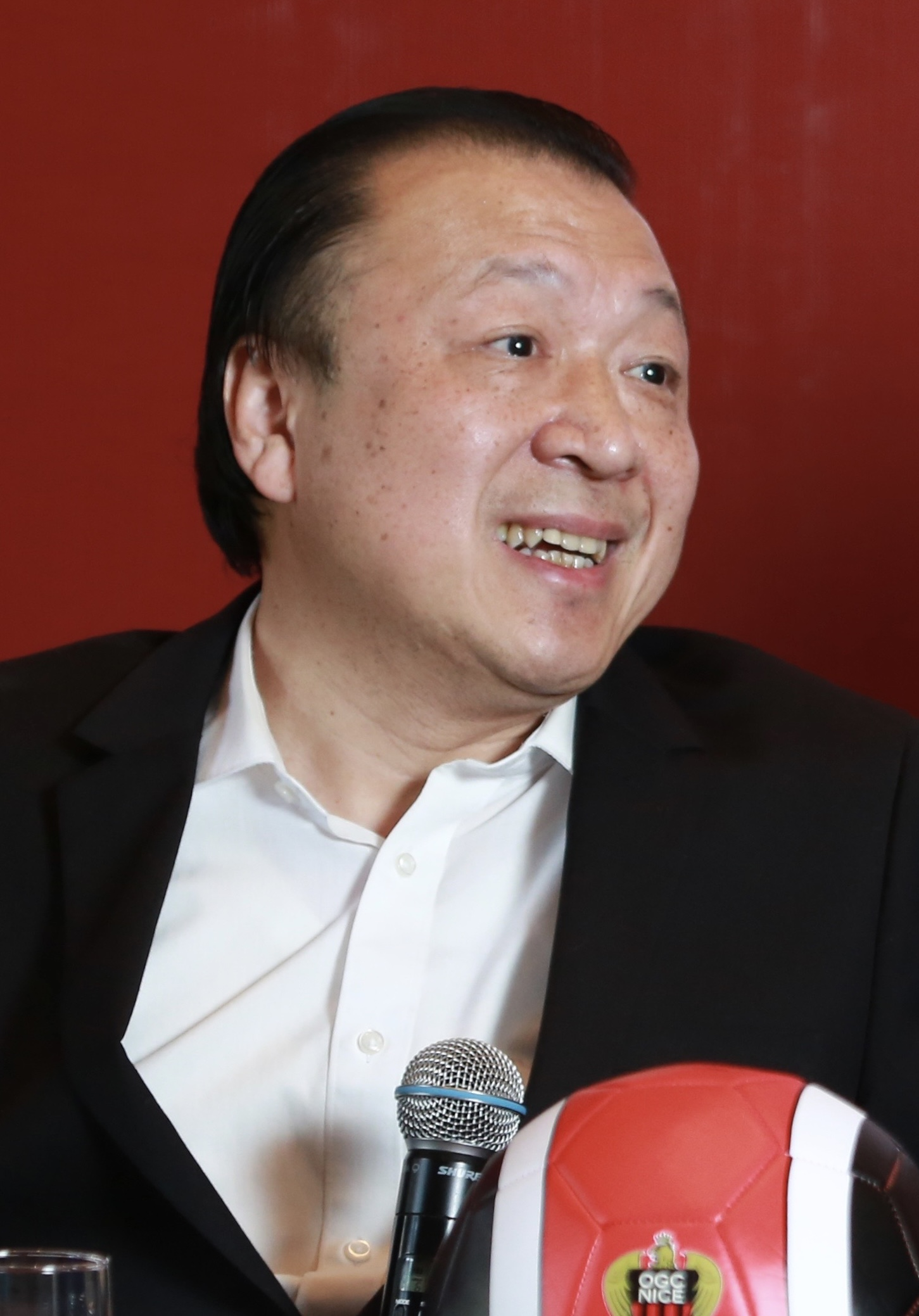
- Lee in 2016
- Born: 1960 (age 65–66); Hong Kong
- Occupations: Entrepreneur; Investor; Sports team owner
- Organization: NewCity Capital

Chairman of AS Nancy Lorraine
- In office December 2020 – present

Chairman of Barnsley F.C.
- In office December 2017 – May 2022

Chairman of OGC Nice
- In office June 2016 – August 2019

Chien Lee (Chinese: 李建; pinyin: Lǐ Jiàn, born 1960) is a Chinese-American entrepreneur, investor, and sports team owner with controlling investments in multiple football clubs.

Lee is the founder and Chairman of NewCity Capital and co-founder of 7 Days Inn. He has invested in nine European football clubs including FC Thun, AS Nancy Lorraine, FC Kaiserslautern, GKS Tychy FC, OGC Nice, Barnsley F.C., K.V. Oostende, Esbjerg fB, and FC Den Bosch, and as of August 2026 holds shares in FC Thun, Nancy, GKS Tychy, and Kaiserslautern. The Financial Times and The Wall Street Journal have described Lee as applying Moneyball approaches to European football. Some of his club tenures have attracted controversy, including for poor league performances, lack of investment into players, and financial mismanagement.

== Career ==
Lee is the founder, Chairman, and CEO of NewCity Capital, a private investment company, focused on the sport and hospitality industries. In August 1989, he founded Lee Holdings Company Inc., a US-based investment company focused on the acquisition of real estate assets. Later in 2005, Lee invested in the hospitality Industry, co-founding 7 Days Inn (NYSE: SVN), one of the largest budget hotel chains in China. In 2014, Lee invested in The Grand Ho Tram Strip resort in Vietnam.

In 2016, Lee began investing in professional sports and acquired stakes in several European football clubs. Since then he has invested in eight clubs in collaboration with Hong Kong-based sports firm Pacific Media Group, forming one of the largest multi‑club portfolios in Europe by number of teams. In 2018, Lee said that he would use a data-driven approach to identify talents, focusing on acquiring young players. According to Forbes, his strategy contrasted with that of many foreign investors in English football where transfer fees are high and success is expected quickly.

Lee's football investments have seen mixed results. Under his tenure, OGC Nice achieved its first UEFA Champions League qualification, FC Thun won the Swiss Super League after promotion the year before, and FC Kaiserslautern reached its first cup final for 20 years. Conversely, his ownership saw AS Nancy slump to its lowest ever finish (narrowly missing the non-professional leagues), Barnsley relegated and Lee fined, Esbjerg near bankruptcy, and KV Oostende dissolve entirely. In 2022, three of his teams were relegated in the same season (AS Nancy, Esbjerg, Barnsley). Of the nine clubs he has invested in, he retains ownership in four as of August 2026.

== Sports investments ==
Locations of Lee’s current and former Football clubs in Europe

=== OGC Nice ===
Lee’s initial investment in professional sports began with the acquisition of the French football club OGC Nice in June 2016, and became its chairman and co-owner. During his first year of ownership, the club appointed Lucien Favre as manager and invested in a new training and academy facility focused on youth development During this period, the team qualified for the UEFA Champions League for the first time.

In August 2019, Lee sold OGC Nice to Ineos, a company controlled by British businessman Jim Ratcliffe.

=== Barnsley F.C. ===
In December 2017, Lee acquired English football team Barnsley F.C. with a group of international investors including "Moneyball" pioneer Billy Beane, and became the co-owner. The club adopted a high pressing style of football, began using a data-oriented approach to identify talents, and focused on signing young players.

During Lee's tenure as co-Chairman, Barnsley recorded a promotion to the Championship as runners-up in 2019, and reached the Championship play-offs in 2021. In April 2022 they were relegated back to League One, and one month later Lee was voted off the club board during restructuring, ending his tenure.

In 2023, Lee and co-invester Paul Conway were charged by the EFL for failing to disclose full details of their ownership structure from 2017–2022. Lee was later fined £75,000 and warned as to future conduct.

=== FC Thun ===
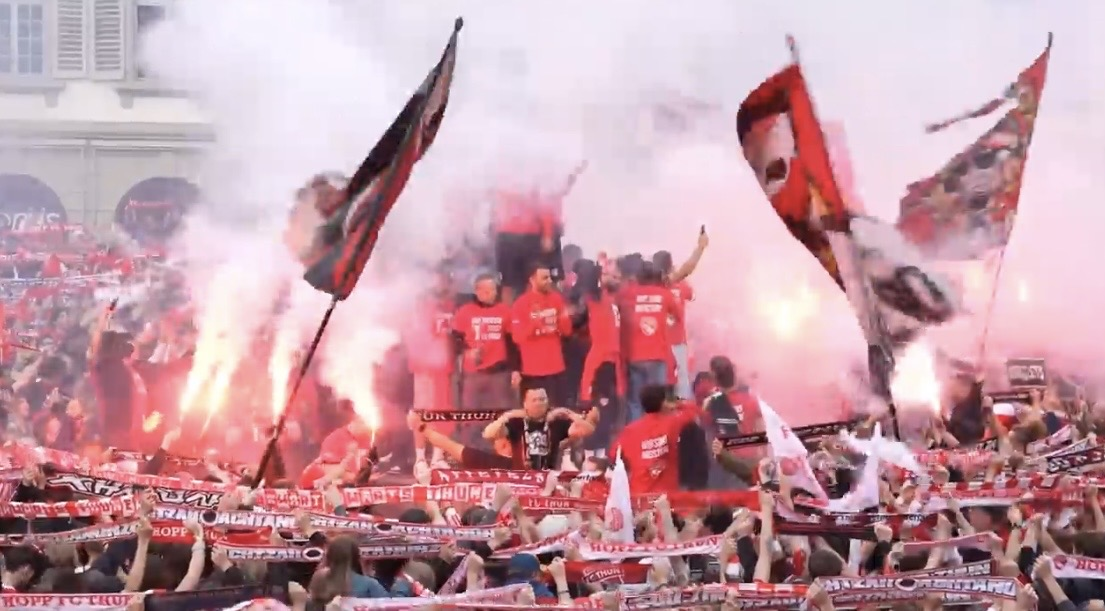
FC Thun celebrations in May 2026, following the club’s first Swiss Super League title.

In November 2019, Lee became a co-owner and investor in Swiss team FC Thun. Investments from Lee and board member Beat Fahrni reportedly saved the club from extinction on several occasions, most recently in early 2024.

In May 2025, Thun won the 2024–25 Swiss Challenge League, gaining promotion to the Swiss Super League. One year later in May 2026, the newly promoted team went on to win the Swiss Super League championship, securing the first major honour in their 128-year history. BBC Sport described it as one of the most remarkable achievements in European football history.

=== AS Nancy Lorraine ===
In December 2020, following another unsuccessful attempt to acquire Toulouse FC, Lee shifted his focus to AS Nancy Lorraine, where he competed with City Football Group. In 2021 he completed the acquisition and assumed role as chairman of the board and co-owner, marking his return to French football.

In 2022, a bottom place finish relegated the club to the third tier for the first time in its history. In 2023, the DNCG announced it would be relegated two divisions to the fifth tier, Championnat National 2, on account of financial irregularities in the 2022–2023 budget, but the decision was successfully appealed against. In 2023, AS Nancy placed 13th and were due to be relegated down the non-professional fourth tier, but were spared due to seventh-place CS Sedan's administrative relegation. In 2025, the club won the Championnat National signalling a return to Ligue 2.

=== KV Oostende ===
In January 2020, Lee was reported to be among the parties interested in acquiring KV Oostende (KVO), competing with David Blitzer. In May 2020, he completed an investment in KVO.

In April 2023, KVO were relegated to Belgium's second division after ten years in the top tier. Shortly after in December, the club was docked nine points after failing to meet repayments and accruing debts of €8 million. In June 2024, with insurmountable debt, allegations of a sabotaged sale, and a failed application for a professional license, KVO filed for bankruptcy. They were dissolved later that month, after 120 years of existence.

In June 2025, it emerged that Lee's co-investor in nine football clubs including KVO, Paul Conway, had been in prison in Spain for over 5 weeks and was fighting extradition to Belgium. Conway was wanted for questioning following an investigation by the Belgian Federal Police Sports Fraud Team, in relation to six fraud allegations linked to KVO's bankruptcy. Central to this was the transfer movement of striker Mickaël Biron between KVO and AS Nancy, both teams owned by Lee and Conway. Biron was purchased by Oostende for a club-record €5 million but then immediately loaned back to Nancy, before being sold to RWDM for €2.5 million without playing a single game for Oostende.

=== Esbjerg fB ===
In March 2021, Lee joined American investors Pacific Media Group, Partners Path Capital and Krishen Sud in acquiring Esbjerg fB, a professional football club based in Esbjerg, Denmark, the 6th European football club Lee invested in.

In 2022, Esbjerg were relegated to the Danish 2nd Division for the first time in 28 years. By 2024, Esbjerg was close to bankruptcy. In February, a local committee applied to overtake and restructure the club. Danish courts sided with the local group and they assumed control, ejecting Lee alongside the rest of the American consortium.

=== FC Den Bosch ===
In September 2021, Lee became an investor in FC Den Bosch, his 7th European football club investment and one of the first multi-club ownership arrangements in the Netherlands.

=== 1. FC Kaiserslautern ===
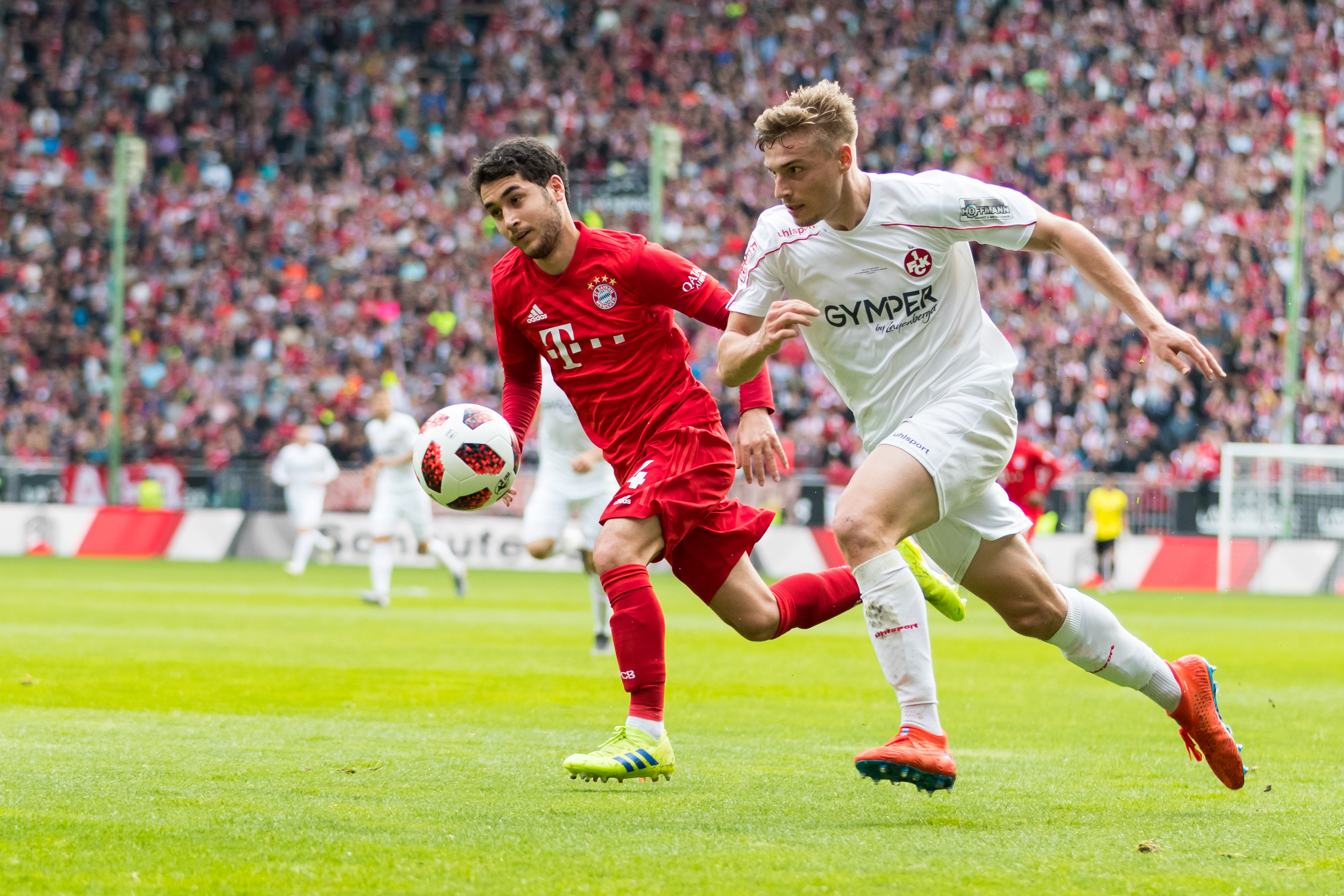
The home game between FC Kaiserslautern and rivals Bayern Munich at the Fritz-Walter-Stadion.

In March 2022, Lee became a minority shareholder of 1. FC Kaiserslautern.

Formerly a Bundesliga mainstay, in 2018 FCK were relegated to the third tier for the first time in their history. That same year, they achieved promotion to the back up to the second division, and by 2024, they had reached their first German Cup final in 21 years.

=== GKS Tychy ===
In April 2023, Lee together with The Seelig Group acquired GKS Tychy FC, a Polish professional football club, based in Tychy, that plays in the Polish II liga. The club was founded in 1971. It is Lee's 9th European football club investment.

=== Attempted investments ===
In September 2016, Lee entered advanced takeover discussions with Hull City FC owner Assem Allam; however, the bid was formally withdrawn in November of that year. He subsequently made an offer to acquire Middlesbrough FC, which was declined by owner Steve Gibson in January 2017. In April 2017, Lee held discussions with Brentford FC owner Matthew Benham regarding a potential acquisition. His reported interest in the club was linked to its London location and planned stadium development.

In June 2019, Lee attempted to acquire Partick Thistle FC. After selling OGC Nice to Jim Ratcliffe in August 2019, Lee sought to re-enter the French football market. In March 2020, he entered negotiations to acquire Toulouse FC., reportedly competing with Michael Dell and his investment firm MSD Capital.

In July 2020, Lee sought to acquire SV Mattersburg.

In April 2021, reports indicated that Lee’s football group was exploring opportunities to invest in German football, including approaching several clubs to assess potential alignment and investment prospects.

In February 2022, reports indicated that he was considering the acquisition of Lechia Gdańsk. In July 2022, media reported that Lee was in discussions to invest in Hellas Verona F.C., which plays in Serie A of the Italian football league.

== Hotel industry ==
In 2014, Lee invested in Asian Coast Development (Canada) Ltd., the developer of The Grand Ho Tram Strip in Vietnam, one of the region's largest integrated resorts. In a 2014 interview with Forbes, Lee described the Ho Tram Strip as a “hidden diamond,” and remarked that tourism is one of the most important driving forces for Vietnam's economic development. Investors in the Ho Tram Strip included Warburg Pincus and Harbinger Capital. The first phase of the Ho Tram Strip development includes The Grand Ho Tram Resort & Casino, a 5-star hotel and resort, international conference center, and heliport which opened in July 2013, as well as The Bluffs Ho Tram Strip, a links-style golf course which opened in October 2014.

In 2005 Lee co-founded 7 Days Inn, one of the largest budget hotel chains in China. Lee saw tourism and the emergence of a newly rich middle class fueling the travel boom, while China has become one of the world's most-watched tourist markets. In 2006, Warburg Pincus invested in 7 Days Inn. In 2007, Merrill Lynch, Deutsche Bank, and Warburg Pincus further invested in the hotel chain; in September 2009, 7 Days Inn was listed on the New York Stock Exchange (NYSE: SVN). The hotel chain has grown from five hotels in two cities in 2005 to 283 hotels in 41 cities when it was listed. In July 2013, the founders,, together with Carlyle Group and Sequoia Capital took 7 Days Inn private to form holding company Plateno Hotels Group. In 2015, Jinjiang Hotels bought 81% of 7 Days Inn. By the end of 2019, 7 Days Inn had 4,700 hotels in 450 cities.
