= Caceres rule =

Transfer regulation in Australian association football

The Caceres rule, also known as the Anthony Caceres rule or Caceres Clause, is a transfer regulation imposed by Football Australia that prevents a player from being registered in an A-League season if said player was purchased by a multi-club ownership/partnership (MCO) and loaned to an MCO related A-League club. This applies until the player's preceding A-League contract is completed or the expiry of the two transfer windows during the domestic season, including the window in which the player was purchased.

== History ==
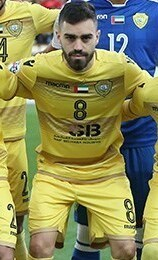
Anthony Caceres, whom the rule is named after

During the 2015–16 season of the A-League, on 15 January 2016, Anthony Caceres was signed by English club Manchester City for a transfer fee of AU$300,000 from Central Coast Mariners. Four days after his signing to City, Caceres was sent on loan to A-League rivals Melbourne City, who are under the same ownership as Manchester City, for the remainder of the season. The move sparked controversy as it was deemed a loophole to a rule which prohibits A-League clubs to request, offer or pay a transfer fee for a player in a national league club; Melbourne City would not have been able to sign Caceres without the influence of Manchester City. Sydney FC chief executive officer Tony Pignata criticised the move since it gave an advantage for clubs under a club-model despite it being within the competitions regulations.

As a result, after a review of the transfer, Football Australia sent a memo to all participating A-League clubs about a rule change that prohibits players, who were purchased by a multi-club ownership, from being sent on loan to a sister club in the A-League until the player's preceding contract in the A-League is completed or the two domestic transfer windows have passed since the date of the signing.

The clause was reviewed once more in August 2024 after the introduction of Auckland FC, which shares a similar club model to Melbourne City, under owner Bill Foley. This was further called upon due to the loan signing of goalkeeper Alex Paulsen from Bournemouth to sister club Auckland. Paulsen recently played for Wellington Phoenix in the 2023–24 season before signing for Bournemouth for a transfer fee in June. Auckland's chief executive officer Nick Becker said that all clubs in the A-League agreed the 'Caceres rule' needed reviewing and potentially taken out for future seasons. However, Wellington Phoenix released a statement from general manager David Dome, asking for clarification on the loan signing despite supporting the adaption of the clause to allow Paulsen into the league.
