= Anthony Caceres =

Australian association football player

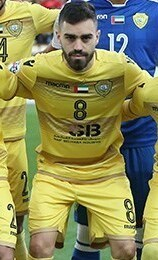
- Caceres with Al-Wasl in 2018

Personal information
- Full name: Anthony Caceres
- Date of birth: 29 September 1992 (age 34)
- Place of birth: Sydney, Australia
- Height: 1.73 m (5 ft 8 in)
- Position: Central midfielder

Team information
- Current team: Bangkok United
- Number: 21

Youth career
- 2006–2011: Marconi Stallions
- 2011–2012: Central Coast Mariners

Senior career*
Years	Team	Apps	(Gls)
2012–2016	Central Coast Mariners	62	(3)
2016–2019	Manchester City	0	(0)
2016–2017	→ Melbourne City (loan)	38	(3)
2017–2018	→ Al-Wasl (loan)	21	(1)
2018	→ Melbourne City (loan)	5	(0)
2019	→ Sydney FC (loan)	15	(0)
2019–2025	Sydney FC	136	(12)
2025–2026	Macarthur FC	23	(2)
2026–	Bangkok United	1	(0)

International career^{‡}
2024–	Australia	4	(0)
- * Club domestic league appearances and goals as of 14 September 2026 ‡ National team caps and goals as of 10 June 2025

Anthony Richard Caceres (Latin American Spanish: [ˈkaseres]; born 29 September 1992) is an Australian professional soccer player who plays as a central midfielder for Bangkok United and the Australia national team.

== Career ==
=== Central Coast Mariners ===
Caceres made his A-League debut for the Central Coast Mariners in the F3 Derby against the Newcastle Jets, starting in a scoreless draw in January 2013. He scored his first goal for the club one year and two days later, again against the Jets, making a run from halfway and shooting from outside the area to open the scoring in a 3–0 win.

=== Manchester City ===
On 15 January 2016, Caceres was sold to Premier League club Manchester City on a long-term contract for fee in the region of AUS$300,000. He was immediately loaned out to their A-League partner, Melbourne City. Caceres' move to Melbourne City sparked some controversy given that transfer fees are not allowed to be paid directly between A-League clubs, and resulted in Football Australia creating the Caceres rule to block the practice in future.

==== Loan to Melbourne City ====
Caceres had a troubled start to life at City, receiving 2 red cards in his first 4 games, the second coming in the 79th minute of the Melbourne Derby.

Caceres scored his first goal for City coming off the bench in a 3–1 win over Brisbane Roar, with his headed goal putting City temporarily on top of A-League table.

Caceres's loan to City was extended for successive years in both June 2016 and 2017.

==== Loan to Al-Wasl ====
Caceres left Melbourne and moved on loan to Al-Wasl in July 2017, including an option for the UAE Arabian Gulf League side to purchase Caceres outright from Manchester City.

==== Second loan to Melbourne City ====
On 25 June 2018, Caceres was loaned once more to Melbourne City for the 2018–19 A-League season. His loan was ended on 1 January 2019.

=== Sydney FC ===
On 1 January 2019, Caceres was loaned to Sydney FC. At the end of his contract Caceres returned to Manchester City and was then signed permanently by Sydney FC on a two-year deal.

== Personal life ==
He is married to Melbourne City FC W-League forward Helen Petinos (married on 2 June 2018), whom he met at Westfields Sports High School. Caceres is of Uruguayan descent and is a Nacional supporter, as he shows in his Instagram.

They are the first husband and wife, to play at the same club in the A-League Men and the affiliated A-League Women.

== Career statistics ==
As of 29 April 2023

Appearances and goals by club, season and competition
Club	Season	League			Domestic Cup		Other		Total	
Club	Season	Division	Apps	Goals	Apps	Goals	Apps	Goals	Apps	Goals
Central Coast Mariners	2012–13	A-League	3	0	0	0	2 (Note: Appearances in the AFC Champions League)	0	5	0
Central Coast Mariners	2013–14	A-League	21	2	0	0	3	0	23	2
Central Coast Mariners	2014–15	A-League	26	1	4	0	1	0	31	1
Central Coast Mariners	2015–16	A-League	12	0	1	0	0	0	13	0
Central Coast Mariners	Mariners total		62	3	5	0	6	0	73	3
Manchester City	2015–16	Premier League	0	0	0	0	0	0	0	0
Manchester City	2016–17	Premier League	0	0	0	0	0	0	0	0
Manchester City	2017–18	Premier League	0	0	0	0	0	0	0	0
Manchester City	2018–19	Premier League	0	0	0	0	0	0	0	0
Manchester City	Manchester City total		0	0	0	0	0	0	0	0
Melbourne City (loan)	2015–16	A-League	11	1	0	0	0	0	11	1
Melbourne City (loan)	2016–17	A-League	27	2	4	1	0	0	31	3
Melbourne City (loan)	Melbourne City total		38	3	4	1	0	0	42	4
Al-Wasl (loan)	2017–18	UAE Arabian Gulf League	21	1	0	0	16 (Note: 10 appearances in the UAE League Cup and 6 in the AFC Champions League)	0	37	1
Melbourne City (loan)	2018–19	A-League	5	0	0	0	0	0	5	0
Sydney FC (loan)	2018–19	A-League	15	0	0	0	5	0	20	0
Sydney FC	2019–20	A-League	27	2	1	0	5	0	33	2
Sydney FC	2020–21	A-League	28	0	0	0	0	0	28	0
Sydney FC	2021–22	A-League Men	24	5	3	0	6	0	33	5
Sydney FC	2022–23	A-League Men	25	2	3	1	0	0	28	3
Sydney FC	Sydney FC total		119	9	7	1	16	0	142	10
Career total			245	16	16	2	38	0	299	18

== Honours ==
Central Coast Mariners

- A-League Championship: 2012–13

Melbourne City

- FFA Cup: 2016

Sydney FC

- A-League Championship: 2018–19, 2019–20
- A-League Premiership: 2019–20
- Australia Cup : 2023

Individual

- Mariners Medal: 2014–15
- A-Leagues All Star: 2022
- PFA A-League Team of the Season: 2023–24

== See also ==
- List of Central Coast Mariners FC players
- Caceres rule
