= 50+1 rule =

Clause in the regulations of the German Football League

50+1 rule is an informal term used to refer to a clause in the regulations of the Deutsche Fußball-Liga (German Football League). The clause states that, in order to obtain a license to compete in the Bundesliga and 2. Bundesliga, a club must either wholly- or majority-own its association football team. In case of majority ownership, the football team is operated as a separate company, of which 50% of the votes plus one vote must belong to the parent club, while the rest of votes belong to the investors. The rule is designed to ensure that the club's members retain overall control via owning at least 50% + 1 of the club's shares, protecting them from the influence of external investors.

== Background ==
Prior to 1998, football clubs in Germany were owned exclusively by members' associations. This meant that clubs were run as not-for-profit organisations, and private ownership was not allowed under any circumstances. This changed following a ruling by the German Football Association (DFB) in October 1998, which allowed clubs to convert their football teams into public or private limited companies. However, the "50+1 rule" requires the parent club to own at least 50% plus one additional share of the football company, ensuring that the club's members still hold a majority of voting rights.

=== Exceptions ===
In cases where a person or company has substantially funded a club for a continuous period of 20 years, it is possible for that person or company to own a controlling stake in the club. This exception most notably applies to Bayer 04 Leverkusen (owned by pharmaceuticals company Bayer), and VfL Wolfsburg (owned by automobile manufacturer Volkswagen), because they have been owned by their parent companies since their inception predating the Bundesliga, and has more recently allowed SAP co-founder Dietmar Hopp to gain control of his former youth club of TSG Hoffenheim. This was later reverted with the club returning to the 50+1 rule in November 2024 after Hopp transferred his majority voting rights back to the club's members.

== Criticism ==
The rule has been criticised on a number of occasions. One of the rule's most vocal opponents is Hannover 96 president Martin Kind, who argued that the rule could be in breach of EU competition law. In 2009, Hannover put forward a motion to change the 50+1 rule, but this was overwhelmingly rejected, with 32 out of 36 clubs voting against the proposal.

The effectiveness of the rule has also been brought into question following the rise of RB Leipzig. Although it is theoretically possible to become a voting member in the association, RB Leipzig reserves the right to reject any membership application without citing a reason. As a result, RB Leipzig had only a handful of members as of 2014, most of whom were Red Bull GmbH agents. Critics also noted that the annual membership fee was relatively expensive compared to other clubs.

== Other countries ==
Although sports clubs in Sweden have traditionally been run as non-profit organisations, the Swedish Sports Confederation voted in 1999 to grant the right for organisations that compete in leagues under their administration to be incorporated as limited liability companies (idrottsaktiebolag). The primary motivation for this was to help Swedish clubs be more competitive on the international stage by allowing for greater outside investment. However, in order to align with the democratic principles that professional sports in Sweden are governed by, a proviso was included that stipulates that the original non-profit organisation must retain a majority voting bloc. This became known as the 51-procentsregeln (lit. 'the 51-percent rule'), and in practice ensures that no single person can own a sports club incorporated as an idrottsaktiebolag.

As of 2011, 25 sports clubs had organised themselves as idrottsaktiebolag. The rule was debated during the 2013 annual meeting of the Swedish Sports Confederation, with the Swedish Football Association, Swedish Ice Hockey Association, and Swedish Golf Federation supporting its abolition. Due to campaigning from the Swedish Football Supporters Union however the rule was ultimately retained.

== See also ==
- Multi-club ownership – Ownership of multiple football clubs by a single entity.
