= Brickell World Plaza =

Office skyscraper in Miami, Florida

Coordinates: 25°46′3.43″N 80°11′26.1″W

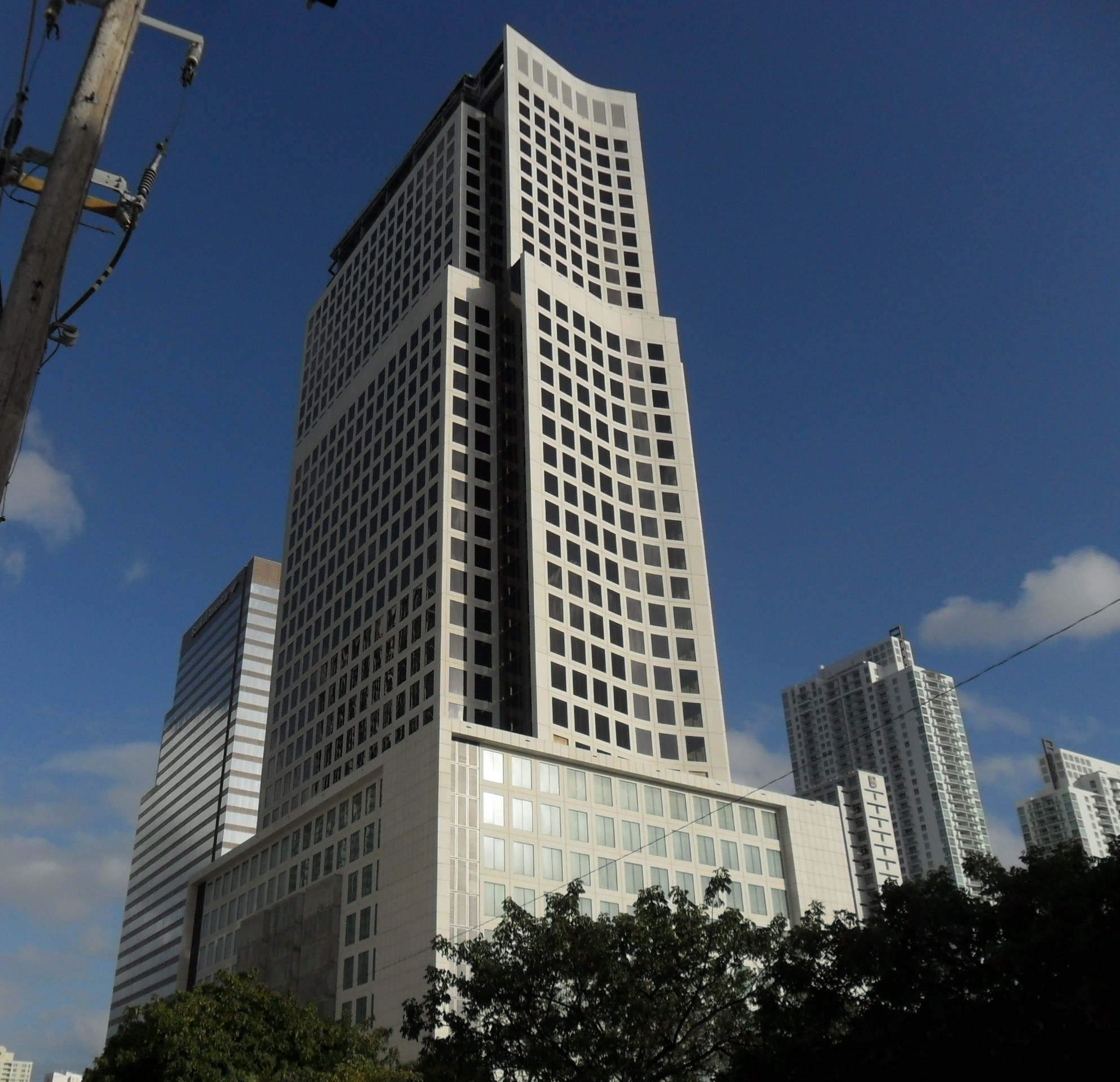
- Interactive map of the Brickell World Plaza area
- Former names: Brickell Financial Center

General information
- Status: Completed
- Type: Office
- Location: 600 Brickell Avenue, Miami, Florida, United States
- Construction started: 2006
- Completed: 2011
- Opening: December 2011

Height
- Roof: 520 ft (158 m)

Technical details
- Floor count: 40
- Floor area: 1,089,391 square feet (101,208 m^{2}) total 614,905 sq ft (57,127 m^{2}) leasable

Design and construction
- Architect: RTKL Associates Inc.
- Developer: Foram Group

The Brickell World Plaza, also known as 600 Brickell, and formerly known as the Brickell Financial Center, is an office skyscraper in Miami, Florida, United States in the downtown neighborhood and financial district of Brickell at 600 Brickell Avenue. The former Brickell Financial Center Phase I, the Brickell World Plaza is a 520-foot (160 m) skyscraper, one of the tallest buildings in Miami. 600 Brickell is located between the Sixth Street and Seventh Street Metromover stations.

The building contains 600,000 square feet (56,000 m^{2}) of leasable floor space, an eleven-story parking garage with 927 spaces, and a 30,000-square-foot (2,800 m^{2}) ground level public plaza.

== History ==
The 40-story building topped out in early 2009, but due to the economic downturn, construction was then suspended, as The New York Times reported that the building was still not completed over two years later in March 2011. The building lost an anchor tenant, a law firm with a $58 million, 10.5-year lease for 15 percent of the building (115,000 sq ft), in early 2009. With the new name of Brickell World Plaza, the building had a scheduled opening date of August 2011. Early in 2011, 600 Brickell got a $130 million construction mortgage loan from Los Angeles-based Canyon Capital Reality Advisors that would fund the rest of the construction. This was one of the largest loans issued in the city of Miami since the real estate crisis.

When 600 Brickell became operational in August–September 2011, it increased Miami's downtown office vacancy to nearly 25%, and Class A Brickell vacancy to over 30%.

The Foram Group hired Jones Lang LaSalle, led by brokers Glenn Gregory and Noël Steinfeld, to handle leasing for the nearly 615,000-square-foot (57,100 m^{2}) building. In 2012, Gregory and Steinfeld said a full-court press to land tenants was finally underway. Shortly before Foram hired Jones Lang, the developer signed a pair of new-to-market tenants — New York-based lender Doral Money and Irvine, California-based mediation and arbitration services firm JAMS — to occupy a combined 30,090 square feet (2,795 m^{2}) at the building. Gregory and Steinfeld have said that they were discussing with prospective tenants for about 300,000 square feet (28,000 m^{2}), although that includes some space being marketed to multiple companies.

== Amenities ==
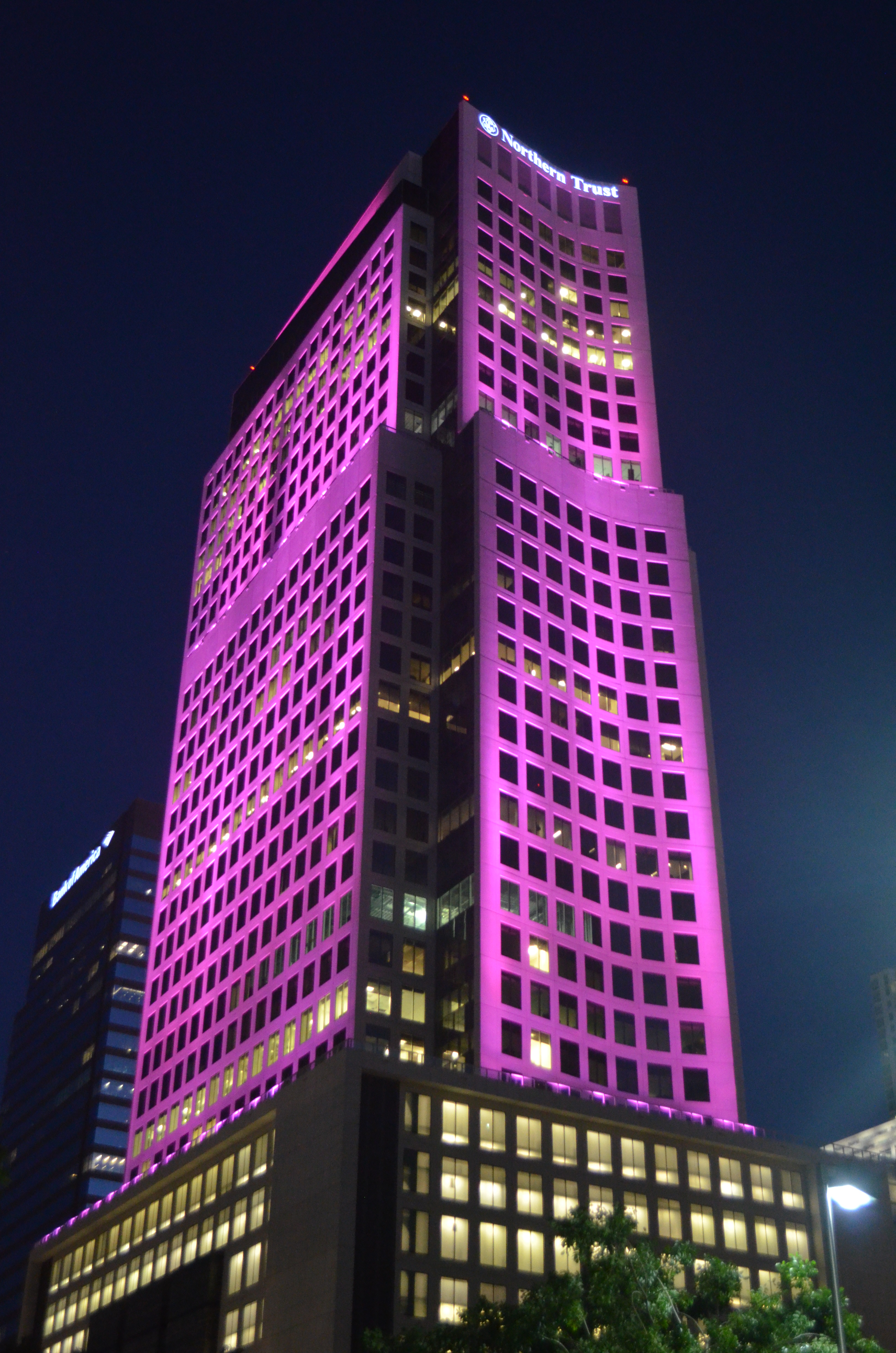
The building lights up at night in a variety of colors.

The building, at the time of completion, was South Florida's first Cisco Connected Commercial Office Building in partnership with Cisco Systems Inc. It was planned to have its own dedicated hub connecting it to the Internet with a fast and secure connection. The project was designed by the global architecture firm RTKL and its developer was the Foram Group.

The Brickell World Plaza was the state of Florida's first building to be pre-certified under the U.S. Green Building Council's Leadership in Energy and Environmental Design (LEED) program. In 2012, it did in fact receive LEED Platinum certification, becoming at the time one of very few buildings in the world of its size to receive this rating, the highest available from the US Green Building Council. The building incorporated pioneering work in efficiencies in energy, lighting, water, and material use, and incorporated a variety of other sustainable strategies to reduce its carbon footprint. The building collects all rainfall and condensed water from the cooling towers in a 10,000 US gallons (38,000 L) tank to be reused for irrigation and makeup water for the fountains at Brickell World Plaza.

It is also the first building in South Florida to be a part of Cisco Systems "Cisco Connected Commercial Office Building", which means that it has a fast and secure, dedicated internet connection. The originally planned Brickell Financial Centre (two buildings) was to include office space, a hotel, luxury condominiums, and a public plaza. The actual Brickell World Center does not feature the hotel or condominiums, but the ground level plaza is planned to be a 30,000-square-foot (2,800 m^{2}) public space as well as 18,000 square feet (1,700 m^{2}) of ground level restaurants and cafes, and an outdoor stage where events may be held, occupying the space originally dedicated to the Brickell Financial Centre II. The first eleven floors of the building above the plaza are a parking garage, while the remaining 28 floors are office space. The outside of Brickell World Plaza is lit up at night similar to the Miami Tower. This began before Christmas in December 2011 with a ceremony with governor Rick Scott where a 40-foot wreath was hung on the building.

== Brickell Financial Centre II ==
Brickell Financial Centre II
- Interactive map of the Brickell Financial Centre II area

General information
- Status: Approved
- Type: Office
- Location: 600 Brickell Avenue, Miami, Florida, United States

Height
- Roof: 903 ft (275 m)

Technical details
- Floor count: 68

Design and construction
- Architect: RTKL Associates Inc.

Brickell Financial Centre Phase II, which had been scheduled for completion in 2011, would have been the tallest building in Miami and Florida upon completion, at 903 feet (275 m). It would have contained 68 floors. The Brickell Financial Centre complex was always planned to be done in two phases, with the second building being constructed after the first, so the second building may still be built, presumably under a different, new name. The second phase was planned to be a mixed-use building, containing several hundred thousand feet of office space, as well as several hundred thousand feet of condominium and hotel space, and would be a substantially larger building than the Brickell World Plaza. The area where BFC II would stand was later turned into a 13-level parking garage in 2020.

== See also ==
- List of tallest buildings in Miami
- Downtown Miami
