= 7 Days Inn =

Chinese hotel chain

7 Days Group Holdings Limited
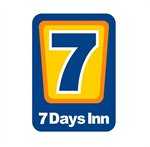
- Type: Private
- Traded as: NYSE: SVN
- Industry: Hotel
- Founded: 2005
- Headquarters: Guangzhou, Guangdong, China
- Number of locations: 4,600 (as December 2018)
- Website: www.7daysinn.cn

7 Days Group Holdings Limited
- Traditional Chinese: 7天連鎖酒店集團
- Simplified Chinese: 7天连锁酒店集团
Transcriptions
Standard Mandarin
- Hanyu Pinyin: Qītiān Liánsuǒ Jiǔdiàn Jítuán
Yue: Cantonese
- Jyutping: Cat1tin1 Lin4so2 Zau2dim3 Zaap6tyun4

7 Days Group Holdings Limited, operating as 7 Days Inn (Chinese: 7天酒店; pinyin: Qītiān Jiǔdiàn; Jyutping: Cat1tin1 Zau2dim3), is a Chinese budget hotel chain established on 2005 7, based at Guangzhou, Guangdong.

It has its headquarters in the Creative Industry Zone in Haizhu District, Guangzhou.

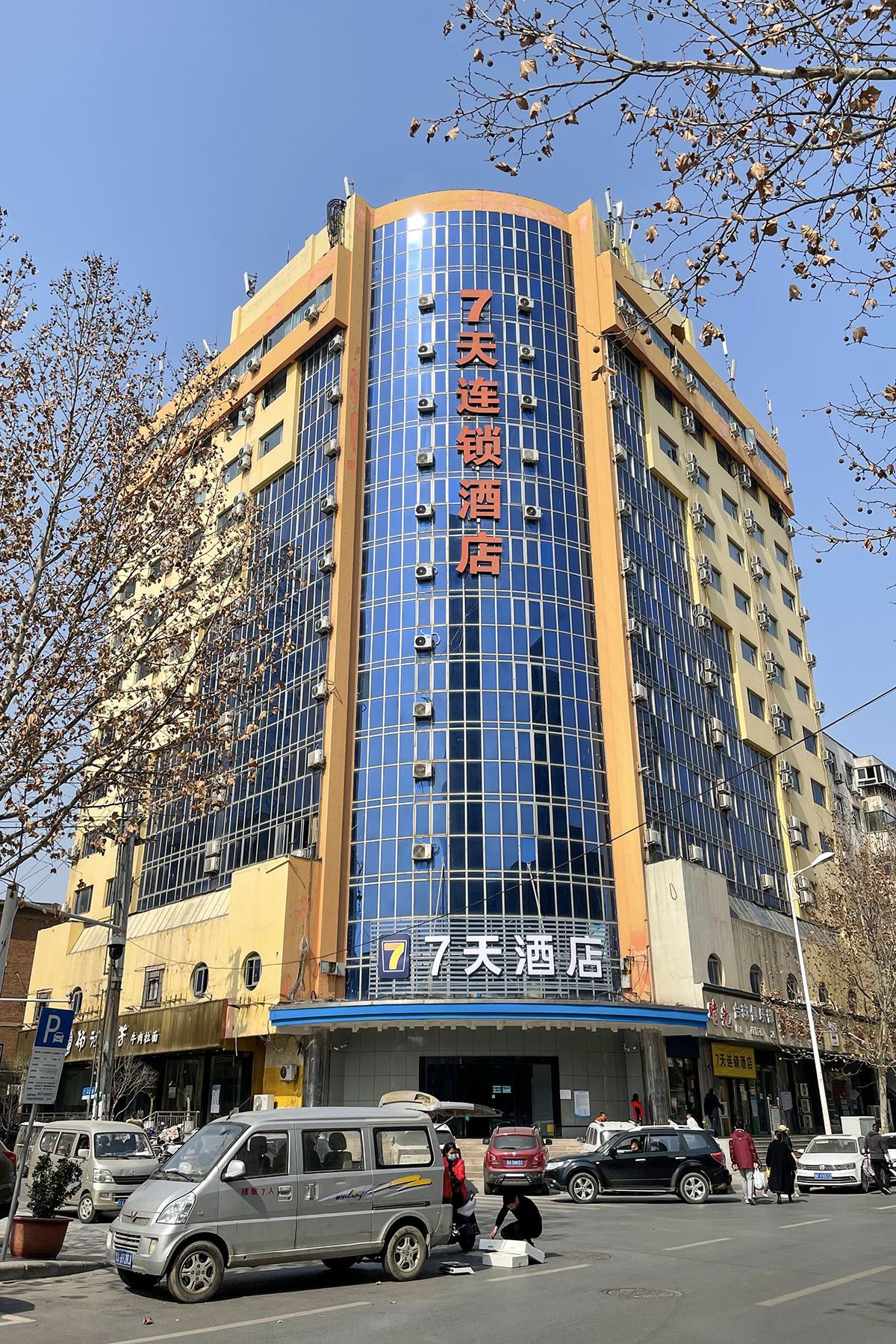
7 Days Inn at Duling Street, Guangzhou.

The hotel chain has grown from 5 hotels in 2 cities in 2005 to 283 hotels in 41 cities when it listed on the New York Stock Exchange in September 2009, As of 2009 its CEO is Zheng Nanyan.

7 Days Inn is a sponsor of the French football club OGC Nice.

By the end of 2014, 7 Days Inn had 2000 hotels in 320 cities and became one of the largest budget hotel chain in China.

As of 2026, it's expanded to Malaysia, with hotel branches at Malacca, Raub and Brinchang.

== History ==
7 Days Inn was established in 2005. Guangzhou was the location of the company's founding.

In 2006, Warburg Pincus invested US$10 million. In 2007, Merrill Lynch, Deutsche Bank, and Warburg Pincus further invested a combined total of US$95 million. In 2008, Actis Capital led a US$65 million investment in 7 Days Inn, in which Warburg Pincus again participated. Despite losses amounting to ¥209.9 million (US$30.8 million) in 2008 and ¥9.3 million (US$1.4 million) in the first three quarters of 2009, it listed on the New York Stock Exchange in September 2009, issuing 10.1 million American Depositary Shares (representing 20.6% of the company) at US$11/share, raising a total of $111.1 million. CEO Zhang retained a 13.4% stake. 7 Days Inns' failure to turn a profit up to that point meant they were unable to make an offering of A shares in China.

In July 2013, the founders of 7 Days Inn, Mr. Boquan He, Mr. Nanyan Zheng, Mr. Chien Lee, Ms. Qiong Zhang together with Carlyle Group and Sequoia Capital took 7 Days Inn private for US$688 million and 7 Days Inn became the Plateno Hotels Group; this meant 7 Days Inn was no longer listed on the New York Stock Exchange.

In 2015 Jinjiang Hotels bought 81% of Keystone Lodging, the holding company of Plateno Hotels, now the parent company of 7 Days Inn, for 8.3 billion renminbi (US$1.3 billion), which meant it now controlled 7 Days Inn.

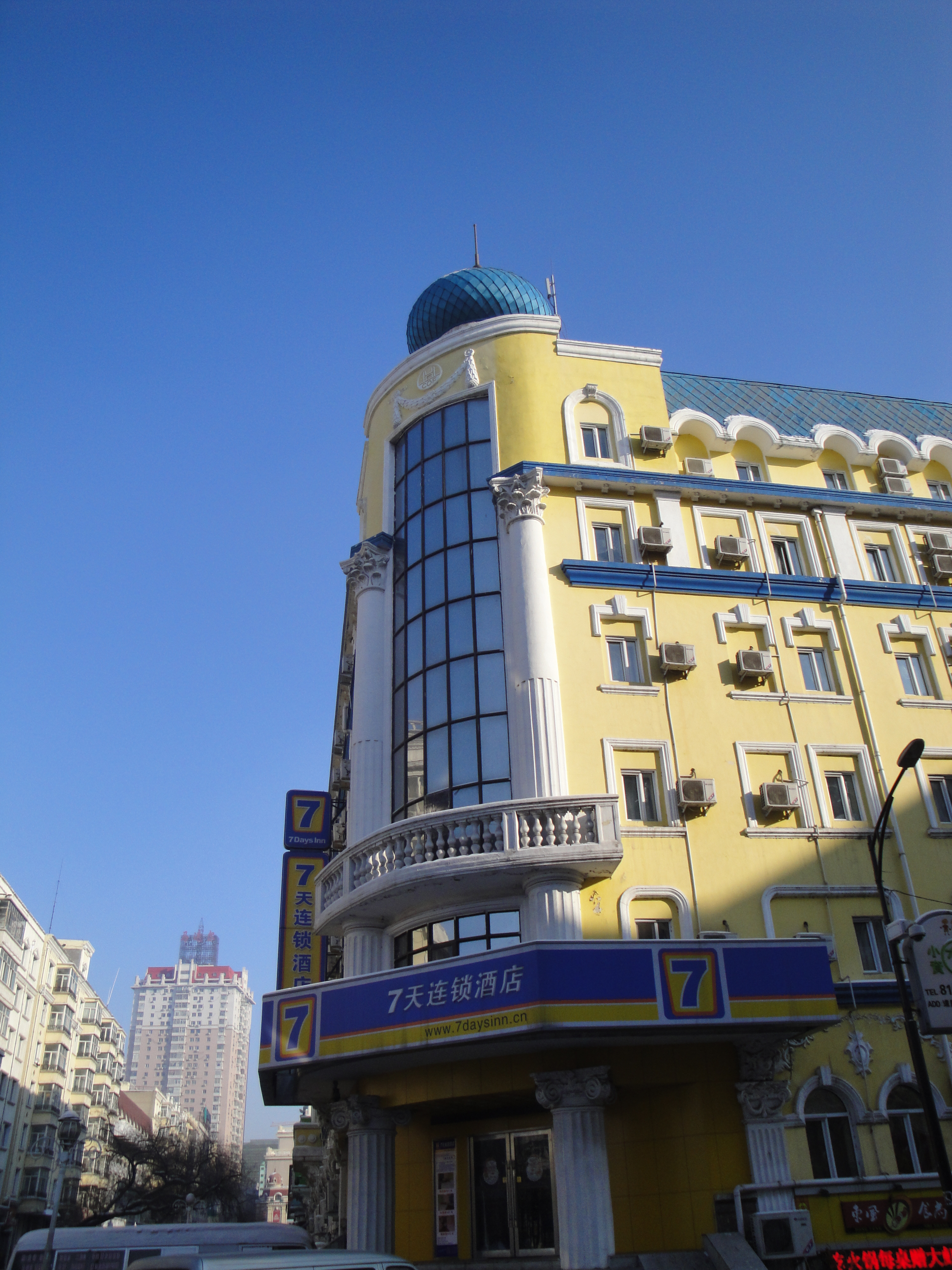
A 7 Days Inn at Tongjiang Street, Daoli District, Harbin
