= 2019–20 Perth Glory FC season =

2019–20 Perth Glory Football Championship season

Perth Glory FC
2019–20 season
- Chairman: Tony Sage
- Manager: Tony Popovic (to 26 August 2020); Richard Garcia (from 18 September 2020)
- Stadium: HBF Park, Perth
- A-League: 6th
- A-League Finals Series: Semi-finals
- FFA Cup: Round of 32
- AFC Champions League: Group stage
- Top goalscorer: League: Bruno Fornaroli (13 goals); All: Bruno Fornaroli (14 goals)
- Highest home attendance: 11,168 vs Adelaide United (11 January 2020)
- Lowest home attendance: 6,177 vs WS Wanderers (14 December 2019)
- Average home league attendance: 7,716
Home colours	Away colours	Third colours

The 2019–20 Perth Glory FC season was the club's 23rd season since its establishment in 1996. The club participated in the A-League for the 15th time, the FFA Cup for the sixth time and the AFC Champions League for the first time.

On 24 March 2020, the FFA announced that the 2019–20 A-League season would be postponed until further notice due to the COVID-19 pandemic in Australia and New Zealand, and subsequently extended indefinitely. The season resumed on 17 July 2020. Similarly, the 2020 AFC Champions League competition has been suspended until at least mid-September 2020 in West Zone. The AFC Executive Committee agreed to played AFC Champions League East Zone matches which are now scheduled to be played between 15 November and 13 December 2020 in Qatar.

== Players ==
Note: Flags indicate national team as defined under FIFA eligibility rules; some limited exceptions apply. Players may hold more than one non-FIFA nationality.

No.	Pos.	Nation	Player
1	GK	AUS	Tando Velaphi
2	DF	AUS	Alex Grant
3	DF	AUS	Jacob Tratt
5	DF	AUS	Ivan Franjic
6	DF	AUS	Dino Djulbic
7	FW	AUS	Joel Chianese
8	DF	AUS	James Meredith
9	FW	URU	Bruno Fornaroli
13	DF	AUS	Osama Malik
16	DF	AUS	Tomislav Mrcela
17	MF	ESP	Diego Castro (Captain)
18	FW	AUS	Nicholas D'Agostino

No.	Pos.	Nation	Player
19	MF	AUS	Chris Ikonomidis
20	MF	AUS	Jake Brimmer
21	DF	AUS	Tarek Elrich
22	MF	AUS	Vince Lia (Injury replacement)
23	DF	NZL	Dane Ingham
25	FW	AUS	Carlo Armiento
27	MF	ESP	Juande
33	GK	AUS	Liam Reddy
50	GK	AUS	Daniel Margush
52	GK	AUS	Cameron Cook (scholarship)
61	MF	AUS	Yianni Perkatis
88	MF	AUS	Neil Kilkenny

== Transfers ==
=== From youth squad ===
N	Pos.	Nat.	Name	Age	Notes
52	GK	(Australia)	Cameron Cook	18	scholarship contract

=== Transfers in ===
No.	Position	Player	Transferred from	Type/fee	Contract length	Date	Ref
9	FW	(Uruguay) Bruno Fornaroli	Unattached	Free transfer	2 years	22 March 2019	
18	FW	Nicholas D'Agostino	Brisbane Roar	Free transfer	2 years	24 June 2019	
23	DF	(New Zealand) Dane Ingham	Brisbane Roar	Free transfer	2 years	25 June 2019	
3	DF	Jacob Tratt	Sydney FC	Free transfer	1 year	1 July 2019	
12	DF	(South Korea) Kim Soo-beom	(South Korea) Jeju United	Undisclosed	1 year	30 July 2019	
13	DF	Osama Malik	(Saudi Arabia) Al-Batin	Undisclosed	3 years	6 August 2019	
4	DF	(Switzerland) Gregory Wüthrich	(Switzerland) Young Boys	Undisclosed	1 year	18 September 2019	
8	DF	James Meredith	Unattached	Free transfer	1 year	27 September 2019	
22	DF	Riley Warland	(England) Fulham	Scholarship	2 years	2 October 2019	
22	MF	Vince Lia	Unattached	Injury replacement	0.5 year	21 January 2020	
50	GK	Daniel Margush	Unattached	Free transfer	2.5 years	22 January 2020	
21	DF	Tarek Elrich	Unattached	Free transfer	1.5 years	28 January 2020	
25	FW	Carlo Armiento	Unattached	Free transfer	0.5 years	5 February 2020	
61	MF	Yianni Perkatis	(Australia) Sydney United	Free transfer	2 months	16 July 2020	
63	FW	(England) Thomas James	(Australia) Wollongong Wolves	Free transfer	2 months	16 July 2020	

=== Transfers out ===
No.	Position	Player	Transferred to	Type/fee	Date	Ref
11	FW	Brendon Santalab	Retired		4 April 2019	
21	MF	Jacob Italiano	(Germany) Borussia Mönchengladbach	Undisclosed	23 May 2019	
22	MF	(Portugal) Fábio Ferreira	Unattached	End of contract	23 May 2019	
25	DF	Walter Scott	Unattached	End of contract	23 May 2019	
3	DF	Jason Davidson	(South Korea) Ulsan Hyundai	Undisclosed	19 June 2019	
23	DF	Scott Neville	Unattached	Mutual contact termination	26 June 2019	
9	FW	(Republic of Ireland) Andy Keogh	(Saudi Arabia) Al-Qadsiah	Mutual contact termination	31 July 2019	
4	DF	Shane Lowry	(Qatar) Al Ahli	Mutual contact termination	8 August 2019	
13	DF	Matthew Spiranovic	Unattached	End of contract	10 October 2019	
15	MF	Brandon Wilson	Unattached	Mutual contract termination	2 January 2020	
22	DF	Riley Warland	Unattached	Mutual contract termination	22 January 2020	
14	MF	Chris Harold	Central Coast Mariners	Mutual contract termination	31 January 2020	
4	DF	(Switzerland) Gregory Wüthrich	Unattached	End of contract	6 June 2020	
12	DF	(South Korea) Kim Soo-beom	(South Korea) Gangwon FC	End of contract	25 June 2020	
63	FW	(England) Thomas James	(Australia) Wollongong Wolves	Mutual contract termination	22 August 2020	

=== Contract extensions ===
No.	Name	Position	Duration	Date	Ref.
1	Tando Velaphi	Goalkeeper	1 year	24 June 2019	
6	Dino Djulbic	Defender	1 year	2 October 2019	

== Pre-season ==
=== Friendlies ===
9 July 2019	Bayswater City (Australia)	0–3	(Australia) Perth Glory	Perth
19:00 AWST		Report	Tratt 39'; G. Popovic 49'; K. Popovic 78'	Stadium: Frank Drago Reserve; Attendance: ~800; Referee: Adam Fielding

13 July 2019	Perth Glory (Australia)	0–2	(England) Manchester United	Perth
19:00 AWST		Report	Rashford 60'; Garner 85'	Stadium: Optus Stadium; Attendance: 50,206; Referee: Andy King

23 July 2019	Perth SC (Australia)	0–2	(Australia) Perth Glory	Perth
19:00 AWST		Report	Harold 53'; Chianese 81'	Stadium: Dorrien Gardens

31 July 2019 Challenge Cup	WA State Team (Western Australia)	1–5	(Australia) Perth Glory	Perth
19:00 AWST	O'Connell 20'	Report	Fornaroli 16'; Tratt 27'; Chianese 32'; Franjic 61'; Brooks 74'	Stadium: Frank Drago Reserve; Referee: Adam Fielding

21 August 2019	Perth Glory (Australia)	9–1	(Australia) Murdoch University Melville	Perth
19:00 AWST	Fornaroli 14', 28'; Tucker 34' (o.g.); Mrcela 40'; D'Agostino 49', 53', 55'; Franjic 70'; G. Popovic 84'	Report	Ciampini 57'	Stadium: Dorrien Gardens

30 August 2019 Surf City Cup	Brisbane Roar (Australia)	1–0	(Australia) Perth Glory	Gold Coast
18:30 AEST	Ingham 61'	Report		Stadium: Croatian Sports Centre

3 September 2019 Surf City Cup	Perth Glory (Australia)	1–1 (3–4 p)	(Australia) Newcastle Jets	Gold Coast
18:30 AEST	Kilkenny 44' (pen.)	Report	Kantarovski 11'	Stadium: Croatian Sports Centre
	Penalties
	(penalty missed) Juande; (penalty scored) Brimmer; (penalty scored) G. Popovic; (penalty scored) K. Popovic; (penalty missed) Franjic		(penalty scored) Ugarkovic; (penalty scored) Koutroumbis; (penalty missed) D. Petratos; (penalty scored) M. Petratos; (penalty scored) K. Petratos

14 September 2019	Gwelup Croatia (Australia)	0–3	(Australia) Perth Glory	Perth
11:00 AEST		Report	Ikonomidis (?); Castro (?); Fornaroli (?)	Stadium: Croatian Sporting Complex

21 September 2019	Melbourne Victory (Australia)	2–0	(Australia) Perth Glory	Morwell
14:00 AEST	Toivonen 40'; Kamsoba 85'	Report		Stadium: Latrobe City Stadium

27 September 2019	Melbourne City Youth (Australia)	0–1	(Australia) Perth Glory	Melbourne
		Report	Harold 90'	Attendance: 0 (behind closed doors)

== Competitions ==
=== Overview ===
Competition	Record							
Competition	P	W	D	L	GF	GA	GD	Win %
A-League	26	10	7	9	43	36	+7	38.46
FFA Cup	1	0	0	1	1	2	−1	0.00
AFC Champions League	6	0	1	5	5	11	−6	0.00
Total	33	10	8	15	49	49	+0	30.30

Updated to match played 6 December 2019
Source: Competitions

=== FFA Cup ===
7 August 2019 Round of 32	Perth Glory (Western Australia)	1–2 (a.e.t.)	(New South Wales) Western Sydney Wanderers	Perth
18:30 AWST	Mrcela 114'	Report	Adam 109'; Yeboah 117'	Stadium: Dorrien Gardens; Attendance: 1,587; Referee: Adam Fielding

=== A-League ===
==== League table ====
Pos	Team	Pld	W	D	L	GF	GA	GD	Pts	Qualification
1	Sydney FC (C)	26	16	5	5	49	25	+24	53	Qualification for 2021 AFC Champions League group stage and Finals series (Note: All Australian teams withdrew from the 2021 AFC Champions League on 4 June 2021.) (Note: The top two teams enter the Finals series at the semi-finals, while the teams ranked third to sixth enter the Finals series at the elimination-finals.)
2	Melbourne City	26	14	5	7	49	37	+12	47	Qualification for 2021 AFC Champions League qualifying play-offs and Finals series
3	Wellington Phoenix (Note: Wellington Phoenix cannot qualify for the 2021 AFC Champions League as they are not recognised as an AFC club.)	26	12	5	9	38	33	+5	41	Qualification for Finals series
4	Brisbane Roar	26	11	7	8	29	28	+1	40	Qualification for 2021 AFC Champions League qualifying play-offs and Finals series
5	Western United	26	12	3	11	46	37	+9	39	Qualification for Finals series
6	Perth Glory	26	10	7	9	43	36	+7	37	Qualification for Finals series
7	Adelaide United	26	11	3	12	44	49	−5	36	
8	Newcastle Jets	26	9	7	10	32	40	−8	34	
9	Western Sydney Wanderers	26	9	6	11	35	40	−5	33	
10	Melbourne Victory	26	6	5	15	33	44	−11	23	
11	Central Coast Mariners	26	5	3	18	26	55	−29	18	

Source: A-Leagues
Rules for classification: 1) points; 2) goal difference; 3) number of goals scored.
(C) Champions

==== Results summary ====
Overall								Home						Away					
Pld	W	D	L	GF	GA	GD	Pts	W	D	L	GF	GA	GD	W	D	L	GF	GA	GD
26	10	7	9	43	36	+7	37	5	2	6	24	23	+1	5	5	3	19	13	+6

Last updated: 7 February 2020.
Source: ultimatealeague.com

==== Results by round ====
Round	1	2	3	4	5	6	7	8	9	10	11	12	13	14	15	16	17	18	19	20	21	22	23	29	27	28	26	25	24
Ground	H	A	A	H	A	B	H	A	A	H	H	A	B	H	A	A	H	H	B	A	A	H	A	N	N	N	N	N	N
Result	D	D	W	L	D	X	L	L	W	W	W	W	X	W	W	D	D	W	X	D	L	L	D	W	L	L	W	L	L
Position	5	5	4	5	5	6	7	11	7	5	4	3	3	3	3	3	3	3	3	2	3	4	5	5	5	5	5	5	5

Source: Ultimate A-League
A = Away; H = Home; N = Neutral; B = Bye; W = Win; D = Draw; L = Loss; X = Bye

==== Matches ====
Win Draw Loss

13 October 2019 1	Perth Glory	1–1	Brisbane Roar	Perth
15:00 AWST	Ikonomidis 34'	Report	O'Donovan 90'	Stadium: HBF Park; Attendance: 9,829; Referee: Shaun Evans

19 October 2019 2	Western United	1–1	Perth Glory	Geelong
17:15 AEDT	Kone 49'	Report	K. Popovic 76'	Stadium: GMHBA Stadium; Attendance: 6,088; Referee: Alireza Faghani

27 October 2019 3	Wellington Phoenix	1–2	Perth Glory	Wellington
18:00 NZDT	Dávila 90'	Report	Fornaroli 11'; Ikonomidis 33'	Stadium: Westpac Stadium; Attendance: 6,054; Referee: Alex King

3 November 2019 4	Perth Glory	1–2	Central Coast Mariners	Perth
15:00 AWST	Franjic 33'	Report	De Silva 17'; Silvera 45'	Stadium: HBF Park; Attendance: 8,148; Referee: Kurt Ams

9 November 2019 5	Newcastle Jets	1–1	Perth Glory	Newcastle
17:15 AEDT	Hoffman 31'	Report	Castro 86'	Stadium: McDonald Jones Stadium; Attendance: 8,038; Referee: Jonathan Barreiro

23 November 2019 7	Perth Glory	1–3	Sydney FC	Perth
18:45 AWST	Fornaroli 44'	Report	Le Fondre 12' (pen.); Djulbic 58' (o.g.); Ninković 65'	Stadium: HBF Park; Attendance: 8,741; Referee: Daniel Elder

29 November 2019 8	Melbourne Victory	1–0	Perth Glory	Melbourne
19:30 AEDT	Kruse 33'	Report		Stadium: AAMI Park; Attendance: 13,084; Referee: Alex King

6 December 2019 9	Melbourne City	0–3	Perth Glory	Melbourne
19:30 AEDT		Report	Fornaroli 27'; Delbridge 47' (o.g.); Mrcela 71'	Stadium: AAMI Park; Attendance: 6,679; Referee: Shaun Evans

14 December 2019 10	Perth Glory	2–0	Western Sydney Wanderers	Perth
18:45 AWST	Wuthrich 18'; Grant 66'	Report		Stadium: HBF Park; Attendance: 6,177

21 December 2019 11	Perth Glory	6–2	Newcastle Jets	Perth
18:45 AWST	Castro 14', 83'; Kilkenny 33'; Chianese 46'; Fornaroli 58', 70'	Report	Topor-Stanley 26'; Ugarkovic 51'	Stadium: HBF Park; Attendance: 6,585

31 December 2019 12	Central Coast Mariners	0–3	Perth Glory	Gosford
19:30 AEDT		Report	Castro 45+1'; Chianese 48'; Fornaroli 62'	Stadium: Central Coast Stadium; Attendance: 6,734; Referee: Ben Abraham

11 January 2020 14	Perth Glory	3–0	Adelaide United	Perth
18:45 AWST	Chianese 25'; Fornaroli 44'; Ikonomidis 68'	Report		Stadium: HBF Park; Attendance: 11,168; Referee: Alex King

19 January 2020 15	Western Sydney Wanderers	0–1	Perth Glory	Sydney
18:00 AEDT		Report	Fornaroli 6'	Stadium: Bankwest Stadium; Attendance: 9,090; Referee: Adam Fielding

25 January 2020 16	Melbourne City	0–0	Perth Glory	Melbourne
19:30 AEDT		Report		Stadium: AAMI Park; Attendance: 6,103; Referee: Daniel Elder

1 February 2020 17	Perth Glory	2–2	Melbourne Victory	Perth
18:45 AWST	Fornaroli 45+2'; D'Agostino 90'	Report	Toivonen 23'; Nabbout 58'	Stadium: HBF Park; Attendance: 9,435; Referee: Stephen Lucas

7 February 2020 18	Perth Glory	4–2	Wellington Phoenix	Perth
18:45 AWST	Mrcela 43'; D'Agostino 45+1', 54'; Fornaroli 90'	Report	Hooper 68', 76'	Stadium: HBF Park; Attendance: 7,248; Referee: Adam Kersey

22 February 2020 20	Brisbane Roar	1–1	Perth Glory	Brisbane
17:00 AEST	Gillesphey 85'	Report	Fornaroli 33'	Stadium: Dolphin Stadium; Attendance: 9,224; Referee: Daniel Elder

29 February 2020 21	Newcastle Jets	2–1	Perth Glory	Newcastle
17:15 AEDT	Topor-Stanley 12'; O'Donovan 74'	Report	Kilkenny 29' (pen.)	Stadium: McDonald Jones Stadium; Attendance: 7,420; Referee: Adam Fielding

8 March 2020 22	Perth Glory	2–3	Melbourne City	Perth
15:00 AWST	Chianese 53'; Fornaroli 65'	Report	Griffiths 24'; Berenguer 30'; Susaeta 34'	Stadium: HBF Park; Attendance: 8,107; Referee: Kurt Ams

14 March 2020 23	Sydney FC	0–0	Perth Glory	Sydney
17:15 AEDT		Report		Stadium: Netstrata Jubilee Oval; Attendance: 4,099; Referee: Adam Kersey

18 July 2020 29	Perth Glory	1–0	Central Coast Mariners	Gosford
17:00 AEDT	Ingham 32'	Report		Stadium: Central Coast Stadium; Attendance: 1,717; Referee: Alex King

22 July 2020 27	Perth Glory	1–2	Wellington Phoenix	Sydney
19:30 AEDT	Ingham 62'	Report	Hooper 32'; Davila 48' (pen.)	Stadium: Bankwest Stadium; Attendance: 0 Referee: Alex King

30 July 2020 28	Adelaide United	5–3	Perth Glory	Sydney
19:30 AEDT	Jakobsen 27'; Brook 29'; Opseth 38'; Halloran 45'; Niyongabire 63'	Report	K. Popovic 33'; Fornaroli 74'; Juande 83' (pen.)	Stadium: Bankwest Stadium; Attendance: 0 Referee: Stephen Lucas

4 August 2020 26	Western Sydney Wanderers	1–3	Perth Glory	Sydney
19:30 AEDT	Duke 63'	Report	Franjic 60'; Kilkenny 78' (pen.); Meredith 86'	Stadium: Bankwest Stadium; Attendance: 1,466; Referee: Kurt Ams

8 August 2020 25	Perth Glory	0–4	Melbourne Victory	Sydney
17:00 AEDT		Report	Rojas 29', 69'; Nabbout 60' (pen.); Kamsoba 90'	Stadium: Netstrata Jubilee Oval; Attendance: 0 Referee: Chris Beath

12 August 2020 24	Perth Glory	0–2	Western United	Sydney
17:35 AEDT		Report	Berisha 27', 52' (pen.)	Stadium: Bankwest Stadium; Attendance: 0 Referee: Chris Beath

==== Finals series ====
22 August 2020 Elimination-final	Wellington Phoenix	0–1	Perth Glory	Sydney
17:00 AEDT		Report	Chianese 18'	Stadium: Bankwest Stadium; Attendance: 0 Referee: Alex King

26 August 2020 Semi-final	Sydney FC	2–0	Perth Glory	Sydney
20:10 AEST	Ninković 24'; Le Fondre 28'	Report		Stadium: Bankwest Stadium; Attendance: 3,477; Referee: Alex King

=== AFC Champions League ===
==== Group stage ====
Pos	Team	Pld	W	D	L	GF	GA	GD	Pts	Qualification
1	(South Korea) Ulsan Hyundai	6	5	1	0	14	5	+9	16	Advance to knockout stage
2	(Japan) FC Tokyo	6	3	1	2	6	5	+1	10	Advance to knockout stage
3	(China) Shanghai Shenhua	6	2	1	3	9	13	−4	7	
4	(Australia) Perth Glory	6	0	1	5	5	11	−6	1	

Source: AFC
Rules for classification: Tiebreakers

18 February 2020	FC Tokyo (Japan)	1–0	(Australia) Perth Glory	Tokyo, Japan
19:00 UTC+9	Leandro 82'	Report		Stadium: Ajinomoto Stadium; Attendance: 7,755; Referee: Yaqoob Abdul Baki (Oman)

Perth Glory continued their 2020 AFC Champions League campaign in their 2020–21 season.

== Statistics ==
=== Appearances and goals ===
Includes all competitions. Players with no appearances not included in the list.

No.	Pos	Nat	Player	Total		A-League		A-League Finals		FFA Cup		AFC Champions League	
No.	Pos	Nat	Player	Apps	Goals	Apps	Goals	Apps	Goals	Apps	Goals	Apps	Goals
2	DF	(Australia) AUS	Alex Grant	24	1	23	1	0	0	0	0	1	0
3	DF	(Australia) AUS	Jacob Tratt	16	0	4+10	0	0+1	0	1	0	0	0
4	DF	(Switzerland) SUI	Gregory Wüthrich	19	1	18	1	0	0	0	0	1	0
5	DF	(Australia) AUS	Ivan Franjic	26	2	18+4	2	2	0	1	0	1	0
6	DF	(Australia) AUS	Dino Djulbic	3	0	1+2	0	0	0	0	0	0	0
7	FW	(Australia) AUS	Joel Chianese	26	5	15+7	4	2	1	1	0	1	0
8	DF	(Australia) AUS	James Meredith	23	1	17+5	1	1	0	0	0	0	0
9	FW	(Uruguay) URU	Bruno Fornaroli	30	13	26	13	2	0	1	0	1	0
12	DF	(South Korea) KOR	Kim Soo-beom	12	0	6+5	0	0	0	0	0	1	0
13	MF	(Australia) AUS	Osama Malik	11	0	9	0	1+1	0	0	0	0	0
14	FW	(Australia) AUS	Chris Harold	4	0	0+3	0	0	0	1	0	0	0
15	MF	(Australia) AUS	Brandon Wilson	2	0	1	0	0	0	1	0	0	0
16	DF	(Australia) AUS	Tomislav Mrčela	20	3	16	2	2	0	1	1	1	0
17	MF	(Spain) ESP	Diego Castro	20	4	18	4	0	0	0+1	0	1	0
18	FW	(Australia) AUS	Nicholas D'Agostino	14	3	5+7	3	0	0	1	0	0+1	0
19	FW	(Australia) AUS	Chris Ikonomidis	12	3	9+3	3	0	0	0	0	0	0
20	MF	(Australia) AUS	Jake Brimmer	23	0	11+8	0	2	0	1	0	0+1	0
21	DF	(Australia) AUS	Tarek Elrich	10	0	4+4	0	2	0	0	0	0	0
22	MF	(Australia) AUS	Vince Lia	4	0	0+3	0	0+1	0	0	0	0	0
23	DF	(New Zealand) NZL	Dane Ingham	9	2	5+2	2	1+1	0	0	0	0	0
25	FW	(Australia) AUS	Carlo Armiento	4	0	0+4	0	0	0	0	0	0	0
27	MF	(Spain) ESP	Juande	21	1	18+1	1	2	0	0	0	0	0
28	FW	(Australia) AUS	Gabriel Popovic	15	0	4+8	0	0+1	0	0+1	0	0+1	0
29	MF	(Australia) AUS	Kristian Popovic	18	2	6+10	2	1	0	0	0	1	0
33	GK	(Australia) AUS	Liam Reddy	30	0	26	0	2	0	1	0	1	0
88	MF	(Australia) AUS	Neil Kilkenny	30	3	26	3	2	0	1	0	1	0
	MF	(Australia) AUS	Trent Ostler	1	0	0	0	0	0	0+1	0	0	0

=== Disciplinary record ===
Includes all competitions. The list is sorted by squad number when total cards are equal. Players with no cards not included in the list.

No.	Pos	Nat	Player	Total			A-League			A-League Finals			FFA Cup			AFC Champions League		
No.	Pos	Nat	Player	Yellow card	Second yellow card	Red card	Yellow card	Second yellow card	Red card	Yellow card	Second yellow card	Red card	Yellow card	Second yellow card	Red card	Yellow card	Second yellow card	Red card
2	DF	(Australia) AUS	Alex Grant	6	1	0	6	1	0	0	0	0	0	0	0	0	0	0
27	MF	(Spain) ESP	Juande	7	0	0	5	0	0	2	0	0	0	0	0	0	0	0
16	DF	(Australia) AUS	Tomislav Mrčela	5	0	0	3	0	0	1	0	0	0	0	0	1	0	0
9	FW	(Uruguay) URU	Bruno Fornaroli	4	0	0	4	0	0	0	0	0	0	0	0	0	0	0
88	MF	(Australia) AUS	Neil Kilkenny	4	0	0	3	0	0	1	0	0	0	0	0	0	0	0
3	DF	(Australia) AUS	Jacob Tratt	3	0	0	1	0	0	1	0	0	1	0	0	0	0	0
4	DF	(Switzerland) SUI	Gregory Wüthrich	3	0	0	3	0	0	0	0	0	0	0	0	0	0	0
20	MF	(Australia) AUS	Jake Brimmer	3	0	0	3	0	0	0	0	0	0	0	0	0	0	0
5	DF	(Australia) AUS	Ivan Franjic	2	0	0	2	0	0	0	0	0	0	0	0	0	0	0
7	FW	(Australia) AUS	Joel Chianese	2	0	0	1	0	0	0	0	0	1	0	0	0	0	0
8	DF	(Australia) AUS	James Meredith	2	0	0	2	0	0	0	0	0	0	0	0	0	0	0
17	MF	(Spain) ESP	Diego Castro	2	0	0	2	0	0	0	0	0	0	0	0	0	0	0
21	DF	(Australia) AUS	Tarek Elrich	2	0	0	2	0	0	0	0	0	0	0	0	0	0	0
29	MF	(Australia) AUS	Kristian Popovic	2	0	0	2	0	0	0	0	0	0	0	0	0	0	0
6	DF	(Australia) AUS	Dino Djulbic	1	0	0	1	0	0	0	0	0	0	0	0	0	0	0
12	DF	(South Korea) KOR	Kim Soo-beom	1	0	0	1	0	0	0	0	0	0	0	0	0	0	0
15	MF	(Australia) AUS	Brandon Wilson	1	0	0	1	0	0	0	0	0	0	0	0	0	0	0
22	MF	(Australia) AUS	Vince Lia	1	0	0	1	0	0	0	0	0	0	0	0	0	0	0
33	GK	(Australia) AUS	Liam Reddy	1	0	0	0	0	0	1	0	0	0	0	0	0	0	0
18	FW	(Australia) AUS	Nicholas D'Agostino	1	0	0	1	0	0	0	0	0	0	0	0	0	0	0
19	FW	(Australia) AUS	Chris Ikonomidis	1	0	0	1	0	0	0	0	0	0	0	0	0	0	0
28	FW	(Australia) AUS	Gabriel Popovic	1	0	0	1	0	0	0	0	0	0	0	0	0	0	0

- (yellow card) = Number of bookings; (second yellow card) = Number of sending offs after a second yellow card; (red card) = Number of sending offs by a direct red card.

=== Clean sheets ===
Includes all competitions. The list is sorted by squad number when total clean sheets are equal. Numbers in parentheses represent games where both goalkeepers participated and both kept a clean sheet; the number in parentheses is awarded to the goalkeeper who was substituted on, whilst a full clean sheet is awarded to the goalkeeper who was on the field at the start of play. Goalkeepers with no clean sheets not included in the list.

Rank	No.	Nat.	Goalkeeper	A-League	A-League Finals	FFA Cup	AFC Champions League	Total
1	33	(Australia)	Liam Reddy	8	1	0	0	9
