= 2019–20 Sydney FC season =

Sydney FC
2019–20 season
- Chairman: Scott Barlow
- Manager: Steve Corica
- Stadium: Netstrata Jubilee Stadium; Leichhardt Oval
- A-League: Premiers
- A-League Finals Series: Champions
- FFA Cup: Round of 32
- AFC Champions League: Group stage
- Top goalscorer: League: Adam Le Fondre (21 goals); All: Adam Le Fondre (22 goals)
- Highest home attendance: 18,501 vs Western Sydney Wanderers (28 February 2020)
- Lowest home attendance: 1,186 vs Newcastle Jets (21 July 2020)
- Average home league attendance: 9,688 (12,109 prior to COVID-19)
Home colours	Away colours	Third colours

The 2019–20 season was Sydney FC's 15th season since its establishment in 2004. The club competed in the A-League for the 15th time and the FFA Cup for the sixth time.

On 24 March 2020, the FFA announced that the 2019–20 A-League season would be postponed until further notice due to the COVID-19 pandemic in Australia and New Zealand, and subsequently extended indefinitely. The season resumed on 17 July 2020. Similarly, the 2020 AFC Champions League competition has been suspended until at least mid-September 2020 in West Zone. The AFC Executive Committee agreed to played AFC Champions League East Zone matches which are now scheduled to be played between 15 November and 13 December 2020 in Qatar.

== Players ==
=== Squad information ===
Note: Flags indicate national team as defined under FIFA eligibility rules; some limited exceptions apply. Players may hold more than one non-FIFA nationality.

No.	Pos.	Nation	Player
1	GK	AUS	Andrew Redmayne
2	DF	AUS	Patrick Flottmann
3	DF	AUS	Ben Warland
4	DF	AUS	Alex Wilkinson (captain)
5	MF	GER	Alexander Baumjohann
6	DF	AUS	Ryan McGowan
7	DF	AUS	Michael Zullo
8	MF	AUS	Paulo Retre
9	FW	ENG	Adam Le Fondre
10	MF	SRB	Miloš Ninković
11	FW	NZL	Kosta Barbarouses

No.	Pos.	Nation	Player
12	FW	AUS	Trent Buhagiar
16	DF	AUS	Joel King
17	MF	AUS	Anthony Cáceres
18	FW	AUS	Luke Ivanovic
19	MF	AUS	Chris Zuvela
20	GK	AUS	Tom Heward-Belle
21	DF	AUS	Harry Van Der Saag (Scholarship)
23	DF	AUS	Rhyan Grant
24	FW	AUS	Marco Tilio (Scholarship)
26	MF	AUS	Luke Brattan

== Transfers ==
=== Transfers in ===
No.	Position	Player	Transferred from	Type/fee	Contract length	Date	Ref
11	FW	(New Zealand) Kosta Barbarouses	Melbourne Victory	Free transfer	3 years	7 June 2019	
5	MF	(Germany) Alexander Baumjohann	Unattached	Free transfer	2 years	2 July 2019	
6	DF	Ryan McGowan	Unattached	Free transfer	2 years	3 July 2019	
26	MF	Luke Brattan	Unattached	Free transfer	1 year	19 July 2019	
2	DF	Patrick Flottmann	(Thailand) Air Force United	Free transfer	2 years	22 July 2019	

==== From youth squad ====
N	Pos.	Nat.	Name	Age	Notes
24	FW	(Australia)	Marco Tilio	18	1 year scholarship contract
25	MF	(Australia)	Ryan Teague	17	1 year scholarship contract
21	DF	(Australia)	Harry Van Der Saag	19	1 year scholarship contract

=== Transfers out ===
No.	Position	Player	Transferred to	Type/fee	Date	Ref
2	DF	Aaron Calver	Western United	Free transfer	12 March 2019	
14	FW	Alex Brosque	Retired		15 April 2019	
11	MF	Daniel De Silva	Central Coast Mariners	Loan return	27 May 2019	
16	FW	(Iran) Reza Ghoochannejhad	(Cyprus) APOEL	Loan return	27 May 2019	
18	DF	Jacob Tratt	Perth Glory	Free transfer	27 May 2019	
20	GK	Alex Cisak	Unattached	End of contract	27 May 2019	
21	FW	Mitch Austin	Unattached	End of contract	27 May 2019	
22	MF	(Netherlands) Siem de Jong	(Netherlands) Ajax	Loan return	27 May 2019	
24	MF	Cameron Devlin	Unattached	End of contract	27 May 2019	
27	MF	Jerry Skotadis	(Australia) Sutherland Sharks	Free transfer	6 June 2019	
5	DF	(Netherlands) Jop van der Linden	Retired		24 June 2019	
13	MF	Brandon O'Neill	(South Korea) Pohang Steelers	Undisclosed	13 January 2020	
25	MF	Ryan Teague	(Portugal) Famalicão	Undisclosed	30 January 2020	

=== Contract extensions ===
No.	Player	Position	Duration	Date	Ref
17	Anthony Caceres	Central midfielder	2 years	4 July 2019	(Note: Caceres formally returned to his parent club Manchester City at the end of his loan contract and then transferred permanently to Sydney FC, signing a two-year contract.)
19	Chris Zuvela	Midfielder	2 years	22 July 2019	
4	Alex Wilkinson	Centre-back	1 year	28 November 2019	
12	Trent Buhagiar	Winger	2 years	5 December 2019	The second year has a trigger clause.
16	Joel King	Defender	2 years	5 December 2019	
18	Luke Ivanovic	Forward	2 years	5 December 2019	
20	Tom Heward-Belle	Goalkeeper	1 year	5 December 2019	
10	(Serbia) Miloš Ninković	Attacking midfielder	2 years	17 December 2019	
7	Michael Zullo	Left-back	2 years	18 December 2019	
8	Paulo Retre	Defensive midfielder	2 years	2 January 2020	
1	Andrew Redmayne	Goalkeeper	2 years	14 January 2020	
21	Harry Van Der Saag	Defender	2 years	15 January 2020	
26	Luke Brattan	Central midfielder	2 years	28 January 2020	

== Preseason ==
=== Friendlies ===
18 July 2019	Sydney FC (Australia)	6–0	(Australia) Dunbar Rovers	Sydney, Australia
19:30 AEST	Ivanovic 11', 37', 50' (pen.); McGowan 15'; O'Neill 22'; Swibel 78'	Report		Stadium: Leichhardt Oval; Attendance: 962; Referee: Ben Abraham

23 July 2019	Sydney FC (Australia)	3–0	(Australia) St George	Sydney, Australia
19:30 AEST	Le Fondre 24'; Barbarouses 45'; Ivanovic 62'	Report		Stadium: Netstrata Jubilee Stadium; Attendance: 805; Referee: Tim Danaskos

30 July 2019	Paris Saint-Germain (France)	3–0	(Australia) Sydney FC	Suzhou, China
22:00 AEST	Mbappé 37'; Cavani 43'; Güçlü 89'	Report		Stadium: Suzhou Olympic Sports Centre

14 August 2019	Wollongong Wolves (Australia)	0–2	(Australia) Sydney FC	Wollongong, Australia
19:00 AEST		Report	Le Fondre 65'; Ivanovic 67'	Stadium: WIN Stadium; Attendance: 3,800; Referee: Tim Danaskos

22 August 2019	Sydney FC (Australia)	1–1	(Australia) Manly United	Sydney, Australia
19:30 AEST	Flottmann 70'	Report	Cholakian 80'	Stadium: Leichhardt Oval; Referee: Katie Patterson

7 September 2019	FNQ Select XI (Australia)	0–7	(Australia) Sydney FC	Cairns, Australia
19:00 AEST		Report	Le Fondre 16'; Ivanovic 38', 74'; Barbarouses 66', 79'; Swibel 82'; Baumjohann 89'	Stadium: Barlow Park

15 September 2019	Sydney FC (Australia)	0–0	(New Zealand) Wellington Phoenix	Sydney, Australia
		Report		Attendance: 0 (behind closed doors)

21 September 2019	Newcastle Jets (Australia)	0–0	(Australia) Sydney FC	Dubbo, Australia
15:00 AEST		Report		Stadium: Apex Oval

27 September 2019	Western United (Australia)	1–2	(Australia) Sydney FC	Ballarat, Australia
15:00 AEST	Diamanti 61'	Report	Ninković 25', 71'	Stadium: Morshead Park

== Competitions ==
Win Draw Loss

=== Overview ===
Competition	Record							
Competition	P	W	D	L	GF	GA	GD	Win %
A-League	26	16	5	5	49	25	+24	61.54
A-League Finals Series	2	2	0	0	3	0	+3	100.00
FFA Cup	1	0	0	1	0	2	−2	0.00
AFC Champions League	6	1	2	3	8	10	−2	16.67
Total	33	17	7	9	57	37	+20	51.52

Updated to match played 4 December 2020
Source: Competitions

=== FFA Cup ===
7 August 2019 Round of 32	Sydney FC (New South Wales)	0–2	(Queensland) Brisbane Roar	Sydney
19:30		Report	Mauk 41'; O'Shea 47'	Stadium: Leichhardt Oval; Attendance: 2,350; Referee: Katie Petterson

=== A-League ===
==== League table ====
Pos	Team	Pld	W	D	L	GF	GA	GD	Pts	Qualification
1	Sydney FC (C)	26	16	5	5	49	25	+24	53	Qualification for 2021 AFC Champions League group stage and Finals series (Note: All Australian teams withdrew from the 2021 AFC Champions League on 4 June 2021.) (Note: The top two teams enter the Finals series at the semi-finals, while the teams ranked third to sixth enter the Finals series at the elimination-finals.)
2	Melbourne City	26	14	5	7	49	37	+12	47	Qualification for 2021 AFC Champions League qualifying play-offs and Finals series
3	Wellington Phoenix (Note: Wellington Phoenix cannot qualify for the 2021 AFC Champions League as they are not recognised as an AFC club.)	26	12	5	9	38	33	+5	41	Qualification for Finals series
4	Brisbane Roar	26	11	7	8	29	28	+1	40	Qualification for 2021 AFC Champions League qualifying play-offs and Finals series
5	Western United	26	12	3	11	46	37	+9	39	Qualification for Finals series
6	Perth Glory	26	10	7	9	43	36	+7	37	Qualification for Finals series
7	Adelaide United	26	11	3	12	44	49	−5	36	
8	Newcastle Jets	26	9	7	10	32	40	−8	34	
9	Western Sydney Wanderers	26	9	6	11	35	40	−5	33	
10	Melbourne Victory	26	6	5	15	33	44	−11	23	
11	Central Coast Mariners	26	5	3	18	26	55	−29	18	

Source: A-Leagues
Rules for classification: 1) points; 2) goal difference; 3) number of goals scored.
(C) Champions

==== Results summary ====
Overall								Home						Away					
Pld	W	D	L	GF	GA	GD	Pts	W	D	L	GF	GA	GD	W	D	L	GF	GA	GD
26	16	5	5	49	25	+24	53	9	1	3	24	12	+12	7	4	2	25	13	+12

Last updated: 15 August 2020.
Source: ultimatealeague.com

==== Results by round ====
Round	1	2	3	4	5	6	7	8	9	10	11	12	13	14	15	16	17	20	18	22	23	24	21	28	29	27	25	26
Ground	A	H	A	H	B	H	A	A	H	H	A	H	H	A	B	A	H	A	H	A	H	A	N	N	N	N	N	N
Result	W	W	L	W	X	W	W	W	W	W	D	W	W	W	X	W	W	W	L	W	D	D	W	L	L	D	D	L
Position	1	1	3	3	4	2	2	1	1	1	1	1	1	1	1	1	1	1	1	1	1	1	1	1	1	1	1	1

Source: Ultimate A-League
A = Away; H = Home; N = Neutral; B = Bye; W = Win; D = Draw; L = Loss; X = Bye

==== Matches ====
Win Draw Loss

11 October 2019 1	Adelaide United	2–3	Sydney FC	Adelaide
19:00 ACST	Mileusnic 44'; A. Toure 52'	Report	Le Fondre 22' (pen.), 28'; McGowan 87'	Stadium: Coopers Stadium; Attendance: 9,903; Referee: Alex King

20 October 2019 2	Sydney FC	2–1	Wellington Phoenix	Sydney
18:00 AEDT	O'Neill 17'; Grant 77'	Report	Dávila 69'	Stadium: Leichhardt Oval; Attendance: 12,536; Referee: Jonathon Barreiro

26 October 2019 3	Western Sydney Wanderers	1–0	Sydney FC	Sydney
19:30 AEDT	Duke 19'	Report		Stadium: Bankwest Stadium; Attendance: 28,519; Referee: Alireza Faghani

1 November 2019 4	Sydney FC	4–1	Newcastle Jets	Sydney
19:30 AEDT	Ninković 6'; Le Fondre 42'; Koutroumbis 51' (o.g.); Barbarouses 65'	Report	Millar 9'	Stadium: Leichhardt Oval; Attendance: 10,511; Referee: Shaun Evans

17 November 2019 6	Sydney FC	2–1	Melbourne Victory	Sydney
17:15 AEDT	Le Fondre 61'; Barbarouses 68'	Report	Toivonen 45'	Stadium: Netstrata Jubilee Oval; Attendance: 16,116; Referee: Shaun Evans

23 November 2019 7	Perth Glory	1–3	Sydney FC	Perth
21:45 AEDT	Fornaroli 44'	Report	Le Fondre 12' (pen.); Djulbic 58' (o.g.); Ninković 65'	Stadium: HBF Park; Attendance: 8,741; Referee: Daniel Elder

1 December 2019 8	Western United	0–2	Sydney FC	Geelong
16:00 AEDT		Report	Le Fondre 27', 45'	Stadium: GMHBA Stadium; Attendance: 4,187; Referee: Stephen Lucas

7 December 2019 9	Sydney FC	5–1	Brisbane Roar	Sydney
19:30 AEDT	Le Fondre 7', 42', 89'; Ninković 25'; Buhagiar 86'	Report	O'Donovan 95' (pen.)	Stadium: Netstrata Jubilee Oval; Attendance: 10,711; Referee: Alireza Faghani

14 December 2019 10	Sydney FC	1–0	Central Coast Mariners	Sydney
19:30 AEDT	Barbarouses 5'	Report		Stadium: Netstrata Jubilee Oval; Attendance: 10,256; Referee: Jonathan Barreiro

21 December 2019 11	Wellington Phoenix	2–2	Sydney FC	Wellington
17:15 AEDT	Piscopo 25'; Dávila 37'	Report	Le Fondre 14'; Taylor 56' (o.g.)	Stadium: Westpac Stadium; Attendance: 8,855; Referee: Chris Beath

29 December 2019 12	Sydney FC	2–1	Melbourne City	Sydney
16:00 AEDT	Le Fondre 29'; Barbarouses 83'	Report	Metcalfe 22'	Stadium: Netstrata Jubilee Oval; Attendance: 17,421; Referee: Kurt Ams

4 January 2020 13	Sydney FC	2–1	Adelaide United	Sydney
19:30 AEDT	Retre 20', 26'	Report	McGree 38'	Stadium: Netstrata Jubilee Oval; Attendance: 10,219; Referee: Adam Fielding

10 January 2020 14	Newcastle Jets	1–2	Sydney FC	Newcastle
19:30 AEDT	Ugarkovic 21'	Report	Le Fondre 14'; Barbarouses 36'	Stadium: McDonald Jones Stadium; Attendance: 8,047; Referee: Stephen Lucas

24 January 2020 16	Melbourne Victory	0–3	Sydney FC	Melbourne
19:30 AEDT		Report	Le Fondre 27'; Barbarouses 53'; Baumjohann 85'	Stadium: AAMI Park; Attendance: 17,814; Referee: Alex King

31 January 2020 17	Sydney FC	1–0	Brisbane Roar	Sydney
19:30 AEDT	Le Fondre 57' (pen.)	Report		Stadium: Netstrata Jubilee Oval; Attendance: 10,724; Referee: Chris Beath

23 February 2020 20	Central Coast Mariners	0–3	Sydney FC	Gosford
19:30 AEDT		Report	Ninković 8'; Tilio 89'; Van der Saag 90'	Stadium: Central Coast Stadium; Attendance: 5,376; Referee: Chris Beath

28 February 2020 18	Sydney FC	0–1	Western Sydney Wanderers	Sydney
20:00 AEDT		Report	Duke 81'	Stadium: Netstrata Jubilee Oval; Attendance: 18,501; Referee: Alireza Faghani

7 March 2020 22	Melbourne Victory	1–4	Sydney FC	Melbourne
19:30 AEDT	Rojas 5'	Report	Ninković 43'; Caceres 64'; Le Fondre 66'; Barbarouses 87' (pen.)	Stadium: Marvel Stadium; Attendance: 15,102; Referee: Shaun Evans

14 March 2020 23	Sydney FC	0–0	Perth Glory	Sydney
17:15 AEDT		Report		Stadium: Netstrata Jubilee Oval; Attendance: 4,099; Referee: Adam Kersey

21 March 2020 24	Western Sydney Wanderers	1–1	Sydney FC	Sydney
19:30 AEDT	Yeboah 82'	Report	Le Fondre 35'	Stadium: Bankwest Stadium; Attendance: 0 Referee: Shaun Evans

17 July 2020 21	Sydney FC	3–1	Wellington Phoenix	Sydney
19:30 AEDT	Le Fondre 76' (pen.); Buhagiar 88', 90'	Report	Piscopo 66' (pen.)	Stadium: Netstrata Jubilee Oval; Attendance: 1,796; Referee: Chris Beath

21 July 2020 28	Sydney FC	1–2	Newcastle Jets	Sydney
19:30 AEDT	Caceres 25'	Report	Fitzgerald 58'; Petratos 90'	Stadium: Netstrata Jubilee Oval; Attendance: 1,186; Referee: Chris Beath

1 August 2020 29	Melbourne City	2–0	Sydney FC	Sydney
17:00 AEDT	Noone 57'; Maclaren 68'	Report		Stadium: ANZ Stadium; Attendance: 0 Referee: Ben Abraham

6 August 2020 27	Adelaide United	1–1	Sydney FC	Sydney
19:30 AEDT	Elsey 13'	Report	Le Fondre 39'	Stadium: ANZ Stadium; Attendance: 0 Referee: Ben Abraham

10 August 2020 25	Brisbane Roar	1–1	Sydney FC	Newcastle
19:30 AEDT	Wenzel-Halls 11'	Report	Ivanovic 40'	Stadium: McDonald Jones Stadium; Attendance: 0 Referee: Stephen Lucas

15 August 2020 26	Sydney FC	1–2	Western United	Sydney
17:00 AEDT	Le Fondre 52'	Report	Berisha 21'; Lustica 90'	Stadium: Leichhardt Oval; Attendance: 1,863; Referee: Alex King

==== Finals series ====
26 August 2020 Semi-final	Sydney FC	2–0	Perth Glory	Sydney
20:10 AEST	Ninković 24'; Le Fondre 28'	Report		Stadium: Bankwest Stadium; Attendance: 3,477; Referee: Alex King

30 August 2020 Grand Final	Sydney FC	1–0 (a.e.t.)	Melbourne City	Sydney
18:30 AEST	Grant 100'	Report		Stadium: Bankwest Stadium; Attendance: 7,051; Referee: Chris Beath

=== AFC Champions League ===
==== Group stage ====
Pos	Team	Pld	W	D	L	GF	GA	GD	Pts	Qualification
1	(Japan) Yokohama F. Marinos	6	4	1	1	13	5	+8	13	Advance to knockout stage
2	(China) Shanghai SIPG	6	3	0	3	6	10	−4	9	Advance to knockout stage
3	(South Korea) Jeonbuk Hyundai Motors	6	2	1	3	8	10	−2	7	
4	(Australia) Sydney FC	6	1	2	3	8	10	−2	5	

Source: AFC
Rules for classification: Tiebreakers

19 February 2020	Yokohama F. Marinos (Japan)	4–0	(Australia) Sydney FC	Yokohama, Japan
19:00 UTC+9	Onaiwu 12', 51'; Nakagawa 31', 33'	Report		Stadium: Nissan Stadium; Attendance: 11,803; Referee: Mooud Bonyadifar (Iran)

4 March 2020	Sydney FC (Australia)	2–2	(South Korea) Jeonbuk Hyundai Motors	Sydney, Australia
19:30 UTC+11	Buhagiar 56'; Le Fondre 77' (pen.)	Report	Brattan 50' (o.g.); Kyo-won 89'	Stadium: Netstrata Jubilee Oval; Attendance: 3,255; Referee: Ahmed Al-Kaf (Oman)

Sydney FC continued their 2020 AFC Champions League campaign in their 2020–21 season.

== Squad statistics ==
=== Squad statistics ===
No.	Pos	Nat	Player	Total		A-League		A-League Finals Series		FFA Cup		AFC Champions League	
No.	Pos	Nat	Player	Apps	Goals	Apps	Goals	Apps	Goals	Apps	Goals	Apps	Goals
Goalkeepers
1	GK	(Australia) AUS	Andrew Redmayne	30	0	25	0	2	0	1	0	2	0
20	GK	(Australia) AUS	Tom Heward-Belle	4	0	1	0	0	0	0	0	2+1	0
30	GK	(Australia) AUS	Adam Pavlesic	2	0	0	0	0	0	0	0	2	0
Defenders
2	DF	(Australia) AUS	Patrick Flottmann	6	0	1+2	0	0	0	0	0	1+2	0
3	DF	(Australia) AUS	Ben Warland	3	0	0	0	0	0	0	0	3	0
4	DF	(Australia) AUS	Alex Wilkinson	34	1	25	0	2	0	1	0	6	1
6	DF	(Australia) AUS	Ryan McGowan	31	1	26	1	2	0	1	0	2	0
7	DF	(Australia) AUS	Michael Zullo	14	0	5+6	0	0	0	0+1	0	2	0
16	DF	(Australia) AUS	Joel King	32	0	17+7	0	2	0	1	0	4+1	0
21	DF	(Australia) AUS	Harry Van Der Saag	16	1	4+8	1	0	0	0	0	1+3	0
23	DF	(Australia) AUS	Rhyan Grant	29	2	20	1	2	1	1	0	6	0
Midfielders
5	MF	(Germany) GER	Alexander Baumjohann	33	1	21+3	1	0+2	0	1	0	5+1	0
8	MF	(Australia) AUS	Paulo Retre	29	4	22+2	2	0	2	0+1	0	4	0
10	MF	(Serbia) SRB	Miloš Ninković	30	6	21+3	5	2	1	1	0	3	0
17	MF	(Australia) AUS	Anthony Caceres	31	4	14+11	2	0	2	1	0	3+2	0
19	MF	(Australia) AUS	Chris Zuvela	8	0	0+5	0	0	0	0	0	0+3	0
26	MF	(Australia) AUS	Luke Brattan	31	1	24	0	2	0	0+1	0	4	1
28	MF	(Australia) AUS	Calem Nieuwenhof	4	0	0	0	0	0	0	0	4	0
Forwards
9	FW	(England) ENG	Adam Le Fondre	31	22	26	20	2	1	1	0	2	1
11	FW	(New Zealand) NZL	Kosta Barbarouses	35	8	25+1	8	2	0	1	0	4+2	0
12	FW	(Australia) AUS	Trent Buhagiar	26	8	1+17	3	0+2	0	0	0	5+1	5
18	FW	(Australia) AUS	Luke Ivanovic	18	2	1+12	1	0+1	1	0	0	1+3	0
24	FW	(Australia) AUS	Marco Tilio	5	1	0+3	0	0	1	0	0	0+2	0
27	FW	(Australia) AUS	Jordan Swibel	5	0	0+3	0	0	0	0	0	0+2	0
33	FW	(Australia) AUS	Patrick Wood	1	0	0	0	0	0	0	0	0+1	0
Player(s) transferred out but featured this season
13	MF	(Australia) AUS	Brandon O'Neill	8	1	7	1	0	0	1	0	0	0
25	MF	(Australia) AUS	Ryan Teague	1	0	0+1	0	0	0	0	0	0	0

Last updated: 4 December 2020
Source: https://au.soccerway.com/teams/australia/sydney-fc/4295/squad/

=== Disciplinary record ===
As of 14 December 2019

Rank	Position	Name	A-League		FFA Cup		AFC Champions League		Total	
Rank	Position	Name	Booked	Sent off (straight red)	Booked	Sent off (straight red)	Booked	Sent off (straight red)	Booked	Sent off (straight red)
1	MF	(Australia) Paulo Retre	3	0	1	0	0	0	4	0
2	MF	(Australia) Luke Brattan	3	0	0	0	0	0	3	0
3	DF	(Australia) Ryan McGowan	2	0	0	0	0	0	2	0
4	MF	(Germany) Alexander Baumjohann	1	0	0	0	0	0	1	0
4	MF	(Australia) Anthony Cáceres	1	0	0	0	0	0	1	0
4	DF	(Australia) Rhyan Grant	1	0	0	0	0	0	1	0
4	FW	(England) Adam Le Fondre	1	0	0	0	0	0	1	0
4	MF	(Australia) Brandon O'Neill	1	0	0	0	0	0	1	0
4	MF	(Australia) Miloš Ninković	1	0	0	0	0	0	1	0
4	DF	(Australia) Michael Zullo	1	0	0	0	0	0	1	0

=== Clean sheets ===
Includes all competitions. The list is sorted by squad number when total clean sheets are equal. Numbers in parentheses represent games where both goalkeepers participated and both kept a clean sheet; the number in parentheses is awarded to the goalkeeper who was substituted on, whilst a full clean sheet is awarded to the goalkeeper who was on the field at the start of play. Goalkeepers with no clean sheets not included in the list.

As of 4 December 2020

Rank.	No.	Nat.	Goalkeeper	A-League	A-League Finals Series	Australia Cup	AFC Champions League Two	Total
1	1	(Australia)	Andrew Redmayne	6	2	0	0	8
2	20	(Australia)	Tom Heward-Belle	0	0	0	(1)	1
2	30	(Australia)	Adam Pavlesic	0	0	0	(1)	1
Total				6	2	0	1	9

== End-of-season awards ==
On 4 September 2020, Sydney FC announced all their award winners for the 2019/20 season.

Award	Men's	Women's
Player of the Year	(Australia) Luke Brattan	(United States) Sofia Huerta
U-20’s Player of the Year	(Australia) Joel King	(Australia) Angelique Hristodoulou
Member's Player of the Year	(Australia) Andrew Redmayne	(Australia) Teresa Polias
Golden Boot	(England) Adam Le Fondre	(Australia) Caitlin Foord
Rising Star	(Australia) Adam Pavlesic	
Chairman's Award	Jessica Allan (General Manager, Commercial Partnerships)	
