= Harry Van Der Saag =

Australian soccer player (born 1999)

Harry Van der Saag
Personal information
- Full name: Harry Eric Van der Saag
- Date of birth: 29 October 1999 (age 27)
- Place of birth: Wahroonga, Australia
- Height: 1.83 m (6 ft 0 in)
- Position: Right-back

Team information
- Current team: Rockdale Ilinden
- Number: 26

Youth career
- FNSW NTC
- 2014–2015: Manly United
- 2015–2019: Sydney FC

Senior career*
Years	Team	Apps	(Gls)
2018–2021	Sydney FC NPL	28	(2)
2019–2022	Sydney FC	35	(2)
2022–2024	Adelaide United	16	(2)
2024–2025	Brisbane Roar	10	(0)
2025–2025	Manly United	23	(4)
2025	Marconi Stallions	7	(1)
2026–	Rockdale Ilinden	21	(3)

International career^{‡}
2019	Australia U23	1	(0)
- * Club domestic league appearances and goals as of 8 August 2026 ‡ National team caps and goals as of 14 December 2019

Harry Eric Van der Saag (born 29 October 1999) is an Australian professional footballer who plays as a right-back for Rockdale Ilinden in the NPL NSW.

== Early life ==
Van der Saag was born on 29 October 1999 in Wahroonga, and later raised in Narrabeen. He took interest initially in rugby league before transitioning into football at the age of 12. He also took interest in surfing and golf as hobbies. Van der Saag joined his first football club with Collaroy Cromer Strikers in their juniors' age group. He takes inspiration from Michael Jordan for his determination and strong mentality.

== Club career ==
=== Sydney FC ===
Van der Saag began his football career at Manly United before joining Sydney FC Academy at the age of 16. He made his unofficial debut on 30 July 2019 in a friendly match against Paris Saint-Germain, where he was tasked with marking Kylian Mbappé. Sydney FC fell to a 3–0 defeat.

Van der Saag made his competitive debut as a substitute on 14 December 2019 in a 1–0 league win against Central Coast Mariners. His starting debut came on 4 January 2020 in a 2–1 win over Adelaide United at Jubilee Stadium. He then signed his first professional contract with Sydney FC on a two-year deal within a week later. In the next meeting against the Mariners, Van der Saag scored his first league goal, including an assist for Marco Tilio, in a 3–0 victory on 23 February 2020.

Van der Saag won his first title with the club, the A-League Premiership, by the end of the season. He was an unused substitute in Sydney FC's record fifth Championship after defeating Melbourne City in the 2020 A-League Grand Final. He was released by Sydney FC in May 2022 as a result of a squad rebuild. Van der Saag made 35 league appearances, including two goals in total for the club.

=== Adelaide United ===
Following his release, Van der Saag was signed by Adelaide United on a two-year contract in June 2022. He made his league debut for the club on 9 October 2022 in a goalless draw with Wellington Phoenix, and scored his first goal in a 2–2 draw against his former side Sydney FC at Allianz Stadium just two weeks later. Van der Saag was soon ruled out after suffering a tear in his right medial meniscus during a training session in late-November. He received surgery in December 2022 and was on a rehabilitation program for the following months.

After struggling to get into the side following his serious injury, his contract expired and he was then released from Adelaide United.

== International career ==
In November 2019, Van der Saag was called up for the Australia U-23 squad that was set to play a series of three friendlies in Chongqing, China. Australia claimed the Dazu Cup after winning all three matches.

== Style of play ==
Mainly positioned as a right-back, Van der Saag is able to play as a defensive midfielder or in a more advanced midfield role. He was described by Sydney FC manager Steve Corica to be a "younger" Rhyan Grant for his versatility and work rate. For Adelaide United, Van der Saag was utilised more as an attacking wing-back, being given more attacking freedom whilst using his endurance to return in defence.

== Career statistics ==
As of 14 November 2022

Club	Season	League			Cup		Continental		Total	
Club	Season	Division	Apps	Goals	Apps	Goals	Apps	Goals	Apps	Goals
Sydney FC	2019–20	A-League	12	1	0	0	4	0	16	1
Sydney FC	2020–21	A-League	12	1	0	0	0	0	12	1
Sydney FC	2021–22	A-League Men	11	0	4	1	4	0	19	1
Sydney FC	Total		35	2	4	1	8	0	47	3
Adelaide United	2022–23	A-League Men	6	1	3	0	0	0	9	1
Adelaide United	2023–24	A-League Men	10	1	0	0	0	0	10	1
Adelaide United	Total		16	2	3	0	0	0	19	2
Brisbane Roar	2024–25	A-League Men	1	0	1	0	0	0	2	0
Career total			52	4	8	1	8	0	68	5

== Honours ==
=== Club ===
Sydney FC

- A-League Championship: 2019–20
- A-League Premiership: 2019–20
