= Western United FC league record by opponent =

Australian football club

Western United Football Club is an Australian professional association football club based in Truganina in Melbourne. The club was formed in 2017 as Western United before it was renamed from Western Melbourne in 2018.

Western United's first team compete in the A-League Men. Western United's first A-League Men match was against Wellington Phoenix, and they met their 11th and most recent different league opponent, Macarthur FC, for the first time in the 2020–21 A-League season. The teams that Western United have played most in the league competition are Melbourne City. The 8 defeats against Melbourne City and Wellington Phoenix is more than they have lost against any other club. Macarthur FC and Newcastle Jets have drawn 3 league encounters with Western United, more than any other club. Western United have recorded more league victories against Melbourne Victory than against any other club, having beaten them 7 times.

== Key ==
- The table includes results of matches played by Western United in the A-League Men regular season and Finals series.
- The name used for each opponent is the name they had when Western United most recently played a league match against them.
- The columns headed "First" and "Last" contain the first and most recent seasons in which Western United played league matches against each opponent.
- P = matches played; W = matches won; D = matches drawn; L = matches lost; Win% = percentage of total matches won

== All-time league record ==
Statistics correct as at match played 22 April 2023

Western United FC league record by opponent
Club	P	W	D	L	P	W	D	L	P	W	D	L	Win%	First	Last	Notes
Club	Home				Away				Total				Win%	First	Last	Notes
Adelaide United	5	1	1	3	4	2	1	1	9	3	2	4	33.33	2019–20	2022–23	
Brisbane Roar	4	2	1	1	4	2	0	2	9	5	1	3	55.56	2019–20	2022–23	
Central Coast Mariners	5	3	1	1	5	0	0	5	10	3	1	6	30.00	2019–20	2022–23	
Macarthur FC	4	2	1	1	3	0	2	1	7	2	3	2	28.57	2020–21	2022–23	
Melbourne City	5	2	1	2	6	2	0	4	13	4	1	8	30.77	2019–20	2022–23	
Melbourne Victory	6	2	1	3	6	4	1	1	13	7	2	4	53.85	2019–20	2022–23	
Newcastle Jets	4	2	1	1	5	2	2	1	9	4	3	2	44.44	2019–20	2022–23	
Perth Glory	5	4	1	0	3	1	0	2	9	6	1	2	66.67	2019–20	2022–23	
Sydney FC	5	2	0	3	4	0	2	2	10	3	2	5	30.00	2019–20	2022–23	
Wellington Phoenix	5	1	1	3	6	2	0	4	11	3	1	7	27.27	2019–20	2022–23	
Western Sydney Wanderers	4	3	0	1	4	1	1	2	9	5	1	3	55.56	2019–20	2022–23	
