= Chris Zuvela =

Australian soccer player

Personal information
- Date of birth: 21 January 1997 (age 29)
- Place of birth: Sydney, Australia
- Height: 1.79 m (5 ft 10 in)
- Position: Midfielder

Youth career
- Sydney United 58
- 2013–2015: Sydney FC

Senior career*
Years	Team	Apps	(Gls)
2015	Sydney United 58	14	(1)
2015–2020	Sydney FC NPL	55	(9)
2017–2022	Sydney FC	10	(0)
- * Club domestic league appearances and goals as of 19 May 2022

Chris Zuvela (born 21 January 1997) is an Australian professional soccer player who plays as a midfielder. He made his professional debut for Sydney FC in the 2018 AFC Champions League group stage match against Kashima Antlers on 13 March 2018.

== Personal life ==
Born in Australia, Zuvela is of Croatian descent.

== Honours ==
Sydney FC

- A-League Premiership: 2017–2018, 2019–20
- A-League Championship: 2019–20
