= Gabriel Popovic =

Australian soccer player

Gabriel Popović
Personal information
- Date of birth: 28 July 2003 (age 23)
- Place of birth: Westminster, England
- Height: 1.88 m (6 ft 2 in)
- Position: Striker

Team information
- Current team: Sydney FC
- Number: 16

Youth career
- Sydney United 58
- 2016–2018: Western Sydney Wanderers
- 2019: Perth Glory

Senior career*
Years	Team	Apps	(Gls)
2019–2020	Perth Glory NPL	17	(4)
2019–2020	Perth Glory	13	(0)
2020–2021	Xanthi	0	(0)
2021–2023	Rudeš	12	(2)
2023–2025	Catania	3	(0)
2024	→ Fiorenzuola (loan)	6	(0)
2025	→ Puteolana (loan)	12	(1)
2025–2026	Perth Glory	9	(2)
2026	Perth Glory NPL	1	(1)
2026–	Sydney FC	0	(0)

International career^{‡}
2022	Australia U-20	8	(5)
- * Club domestic league appearances and goals as of 10 August 2026 ‡ National team caps and goals as of 28 September 2022

Gabriel Popović (Croatian: [pǒpovit͡ɕ]; born 28 July 2003) is a professional soccer player who plays as a striker for Sydney FC. Born in England, he played for the Australia under-20 national team.

== Club career ==
On 7 August 2019, he made his professional debut against Western Sydney Wanderers in the 2019 FFA Cup.

On 10 August 2023, Popovic signed with Catania in Italian third-tier Serie C. On 1 February 2024, he was loaned by Fiorenzuola.

== Personal life ==
Popović is the son of former Crystal Palace and Socceroos player Tony Popović, and the younger brother of Kristian Popović.

Popović is trilingual, being able to speak Croatian, English and Italian.
