= 2019–20 A-League =

43rd season of top-tier soccer league in Australia

A-League
- Season: 2019–20
- Dates: 11 October 2019 – 30 August 2020
- Champions: Sydney FC (5th title)
- Premiers: Sydney FC (4th title)
- Champions League: Sydney FC; Melbourne City; Brisbane Roar
- Matches: 148
- Goals: 431 (2.91 per match)
- Top goalscorer: Jamie Maclaren (23 goals)
- Biggest home win: Sydney FC 5–1 Brisbane Roar (7 December 2019); Perth Glory 6–2 Newcastle Jets (21 December 2019); Western United 6–2 Central Coast Mariners (1 March 2020)
- Biggest away win: Newcastle Jets 0–4 Melbourne City (6 December 2019)
- Highest scoring: Perth Glory 6–2 Newcastle Jets (21 December 2019); Western United 6–2 Central Coast Mariners (1 March 2020)
- Longest winning run: 6 matches Sydney FC
- Longest unbeaten run: 12 matches Sydney FC
- Longest winless run: 10 matches Central Coast Mariners
- Longest losing run: 10 matches Central Coast Mariners
- Highest attendance: 33,523; Melbourne Victory vs. Melbourne City (12 October 2019)
- Lowest attendance: 1,035; Central Coast Mariners vs. Western Sydney Wanderers (27 July 2020)
- Average attendance: 9,428 ( 983)

The 2019–20 A-League, also known as the 2019–20 Hyundai A-League for sponsorship reasons, was the 43rd season of national level soccer in Australia, and the 15th since the establishment of the A-League in 2004. The regular season commenced on 11 October 2019 and was scheduled to conclude on 26 April 2020, though was postponed to 19 August 2020 as a result of the COVID-19 pandemic. The pandemic caused Football Federation Australia (FFA) to suspend the season from late March to mid July. The season resumed on 17 July 2020, which meant the finals occurred in mid-August and the Grand Final was held on 30 August 2020.

Sydney FC were the defending champions and Perth Glory were the defending premiers.

== Clubs ==
The league has been expanded to eleven teams, with the addition of the Western United starting their first season.

Club	City	Home Ground	Capacity
Adelaide United	Adelaide	Coopers Stadium	16,500
Brisbane Roar	Brisbane	Suncorp Stadium	52,500
Brisbane Roar	Brisbane	Dolphin Stadium	10,000
Brisbane Roar	Brisbane	Cbus Super Stadium	27,000
Central Coast Mariners	Gosford	Central Coast Stadium	20,059
Melbourne City	Melbourne	AAMI Park	30,050
Melbourne Victory	Melbourne	Marvel Stadium	56,347
Melbourne Victory	Melbourne	AAMI Park	30,050
Newcastle Jets	Newcastle	McDonald Jones Stadium	33,000
Perth Glory	Perth	HBF Park	20,500
Sydney FC	Sydney	Netstrata Jubilee Oval	20,500
Sydney FC	Sydney	Leichhardt Oval	20,000
Wellington Phoenix	Wellington	Sky Stadium	34,500
Wellington Phoenix	Wellington	Eden Park	50,000
Western Sydney Wanderers	Sydney	Bankwest Stadium	30,000
Western United	Melbourne	GMHBA Stadium	36,000
Western United	Melbourne	Mars Stadium	11,000
Western United	Melbourne	VU Whitten Oval	12,000

=== Personnel and kits ===
Team	Manager	Captain	Kit manufacturer	Kit sponsor
Adelaide United	(Australia) Carl Veart (caretaker)	(Denmark) Michael Jakobsen	Macron	Flinders University #BookThemOut^{1}
Brisbane Roar	(Australia) Warren Moon	(Scotland) Tom Aldred	Umbro	Actron Air
Central Coast Mariners	(Australia) Alen Stajcic	(Australia) Matt Simon	Umbro	Masterfoods; MATE^{1}
Melbourne City	(France) Erick Mombaerts	(Australia) Scott Jamieson	Puma	Etihad Airways
Melbourne Victory	(Scotland) Grant Brebner (caretaker)	Vacant	Adidas	Metricon
Newcastle Jets	(Wales) Carl Robinson	(Australia) Nigel Boogaard	Viva Sports	#FootballForFires; Inspirations Paint^{1}
Perth Glory	(Australia) Tony Popovic	(Spain) Diego Castro	Macron	BHP
Sydney FC	(Australia) Steve Corica	(Australia) Alex Wilkinson	Under Armour	The Star
Wellington Phoenix	(Australia) Ufuk Talay	(England) Steven Taylor	Paladin Sports	Huawei
Western Sydney Wanderers	(Australia) Jean-Paul de Marigny	(Australia) Mitchell Duke	Nike	Centuria; JD Sports^{1}
Western United	(Australia) Marko Rudan	(Italy) Alessandro Diamanti	Kappa	Probuild

1. Away kit.

=== Managerial changes ===
Team	Outgoing manager	Manner of departure	Date of vacancy	Position on table	Incoming manager	Date of appointment
Brisbane Roar	(Wales) Darren Davies (caretaker)	End of caretaker spell	25 April 2019	Pre-season	(England) Robbie Fowler	23 April 2019
Wellington Phoenix	(Australia) Marko Rudan	Resigned	4 May 2019	Pre-season	(Australia) Ufuk Talay	4 May 2019
Melbourne City	(England) Warren Joyce	End of contract	8 May 2019	Pre-season	(France) Erick Mombaerts	27 June 2019
Adelaide United	(Germany) Marco Kurz	End of contract	10 May 2019	Pre-season	(Netherlands) Gertjan Verbeek	23 May 2019
Melbourne Victory	(Australia) Kevin Muscat	Resigned	23 May 2019	Pre-season	(Germany) Marco Kurz	28 June 2019
Western United	Inaugural manager			Pre-season	(Australia) Marko Rudan	23 May 2019
Newcastle Jets	(Scotland) Ernie Merrick	Sacked	6 January 2020	11th	(Australia) Craig Deans (China) Qiang Li (caretakers)	6 January 2020
Melbourne Victory	(Germany) Marco Kurz	Sacked	15 January 2020	6th	(Spain) Carlos Pérez Salvachúa (caretaker)	15 January 2020
Western Sydney Wanderers	(Germany) Markus Babbel	Sacked	20 January 2020	9th	(Australia) Jean-Paul de Marigny (caretaker)	20 January 2020
Newcastle Jets	(Australia) Craig Deans (China) Qiang Li (caretakers)	End of caretaker spell	6 February 2020	11th	(Wales) Carl Robinson	6 February 2020
Adelaide United	(Netherlands) Gertjan Verbeek	Mutual contract termination	29 April 2020	7th	(Australia) Carl Veart (caretaker)	15 June 2020
Melbourne Victory	(Spain) Carlos Pérez Salvachúa (caretaker)	Resigned	30 May 2020	10th	(Scotland) Grant Brebner (caretaker)	11 June 2020
Brisbane Roar	(England) Robbie Fowler	Resigned	29 June 2020	4th	(Wales) Darren Davies (Australia) Warren Moon (caretakers)	29 June 2020
Western Sydney Wanderers	(Australia) Jean-Paul de Marigny (caretaker)	Promoted to full time	14 July 2020	9th	(Australia) Jean-Paul de Marigny	14 July 2020
Brisbane Roar	(Wales) Darren Davies (Australia) Warren Moon (caretakers)	End of caretaker spell	16 July 2020	4th	(Australia) Warren Moon	16 July 2020

=== Foreign players ===
Club	Visa 1	Visa 2	Visa 3	Visa 4	Visa 5	Non-Visa foreigner(s)	Former player(s)
Adelaide United	(China) Chen Yongbin	(Denmark) Michael Jakobsen	(Norway) Kristian Opseth			(Burundi) Pacifique Niyongabire^{2}	(Curaçao) Michaël Maria^{5} (Germany) Mirko Boland^{5}
Brisbane Roar	(England) Macaulay Gillesphey	(Republic of Ireland) Jay O'Shea	(New Zealand) Matthew Ridenton	(Scotland) Tom Aldred	(Wales) Aaron Amadi-Holloway	(England) Jamie Young^{2} (New Zealand) Max Crocombe^{2} (New Zealand) Jai Ingham^{2} (Sri Lanka) Jack Hingert^{2}	(Republic of Ireland) Roy O'Donovan
Central Coast Mariners	(Brazil) Jair	(New Zealand) Michael McGlinchey	(Scotland) Ziggy Gordon	(Serbia) Milan Đurić		(New Zealand) Gianni Stensness^{2}	(South Korea) Kim Eun-sun^{5}
Melbourne City	(Austria) Richard Windbichler	(England) Craig Noone	(France) Florin Berenguer	(Uruguay) Adrián Luna			(Scotland) Jack Hendry^{5} (Spain) Markel Susaeta^{5} (Uruguay) Javier Cabrera
Melbourne Victory	(Albania) Migjen Basha	(New Zealand) Marco Rojas				(Burundi) Elvis Kamsoba^{2} (Ivory Coast) Adama Traoré^{1} (New Zealand) Storm Roux^{2} (South Sudan) Kenny Athiu^{2}	(Austria) Kristijan Dobras (Denmark) Jakob Poulsen^{5} (Germany) Tim Hoogland^{5} (Sweden) Ola Toivonen^{5}
Newcastle Jets	(Republic of Ireland) Roy O'Donovan	(Panama) Abdiel Arroyo	(Wales) Joe Ledley				(England) Kaine Sheppard^{1, 5} (Republic of Ireland) Wes Hoolahan^{5} (New Zealand) Glen Moss^{2, 5} (New Zealand) Matthew Ridenton (Northern Ireland) Bobby Burns^{5}
Perth Glory	(Spain) Diego Castro	(Spain) Juande	(Uruguay) Bruno Fornaroli			(New Zealand) Dane Ingham^{2}	(England) Thomas James^{1} (South Korea) Kim Soo-beom^{5} (Switzerland) Gregory Wüthrich^{5}
Sydney FC	(England) Adam Le Fondre	(Germany) Alexander Baumjohann	(New Zealand) Kosta Barbarouses	(Serbia) Miloš Ninković			
Wellington Phoenix	(England) David Ball	(England) Gary Hooper	(England) Steven Taylor	(Germany) Matti Steinmann	(Mexico) Ulises Dávila		
Western Sydney Wanderers	(Germany) Patrick Ziegler	(Republic of Ireland) Simon Cox	(Poland) Radosław Majewski	(Switzerland) Daniel Lopar	(Switzerland) Pirmin Schwegler	(Germany) Nicolai Müller^{3} (North Macedonia) Daniel Georgievski^{2} (Sudan) Mohamed Adam^{2}	(Germany) Alexander Meier
Western United	(Italy) Alessandro Diamanti	(Japan) Tomoki Imai	(Poland) Filip Kurto			(Kosovo) Besart Berisha^{1} (New Zealand) Kwabena Appiah^{2} (New Zealand) Andrew Durante^{2}	(Greece) Panagiotis Kone (Turkey) Ersan Gülüm^{2} (Croatia) Dario Jertec^{5}

The following do not fill a Visa position:
^{1}Those players who were born and started their professional career abroad but have since gained Australian citizenship (or New Zealand citizenship, in the case of Wellington Phoenix);
^{2}Australian citizens (or New Zealand citizens, in the case of Wellington Phoenix) who have chosen to represent another national team;
^{3}Injury Replacement Players, or National Team Replacement Players;
^{4}Guest Players (eligible to play a maximum of fourteen games);
^{5}Players who left at the end of their contract, which was originally at the end of the season, but became mid-season due to the COVID-19 pandemic in Australia extending the season

=== Salary cap exemptions and captains ===
Club	First Designated	Second Designated	Captain	Vice-Captain
Adelaide United	None	None	(Denmark) Michael Jakobsen	None
Brisbane Roar	None	None	(Scotland) Tom Aldred	(Republic of Ireland) Roy O'Donovan (Note: O'Donovan was vice-captain until he transferred to Newcastle Jets mid-season on 31 January 2020.)
Central Coast Mariners	(Australia) Daniel De Silva	None	(Australia) Matt Simon	None
Melbourne City	(Australia) Jamie Maclaren	None	(Australia) Scott Jamieson	None
Melbourne Victory	(Sweden) Ola Toivonen (Note: Toivonen left Melbourne Victory and his marquee deal at end of his original contract on 4 June 2020, which was before the official end of the season.)	(Australia) Robbie Kruse	(Sweden) Ola Toivonen (Note: Toivonen was Melbourne Victory's captain until the end of his original contract on 4 June 2020, which was before the official end of the season.)	None
Newcastle Jets	None	None	(Australia) Nigel Boogaard	(Australia) Nikolai Topor-Stanley
Perth Glory	(Spain) Diego Castro	(Uruguay) Bruno Fornaroli	(Spain) Diego Castro	None
Sydney FC	(England) Adam Le Fondre	None	(Australia) Alex Wilkinson	None
Wellington Phoenix	(England) Gary Hooper	None	(England) Steven Taylor	(New Zealand) Alex Rufer
Western Sydney Wanderers	(Germany) Alexander Meier (Note: Meier was mutually released from his contract and marquee deal by Western Sydney Wanderers part-way through on 16 January 2020.)	None	(Australia) Mitchell Duke	(Australia) Dylan McGowan
Western United	(Greece) Panagiotis Kone (Note: Kone was mutually released from his contract and marquee deal by Western United part-way through on 13 July 2020.)	(Italy) Alessandro Diamanti	(Italy) Alessandro Diamanti	None

== Regular season ==
=== Effects of the 2019–20 COVID-19 pandemic ===
Due to the self isolation requirements after overseas travel imposed by the Australian Government on 16 March, both Melbourne Victory and Wellington Phoenix were required to self-isolate having returned from playing in Wellington on 15 March 2020. This led to four games involving both clubs being postponed.

On 16 March 2020, due to restrictions imposed by the Australian Government of gatherings involving more than 500 people, the FFA announced that the remainder of the season would proceed with all games being played behind closed doors. Wellington Phoenix had intended to relocate for the remainder of the season in Sydney in order to keep playing the remainder of its scheduled games. The season was suspended on 24 March.

The season resumed on 17 July 2020, with almost all of the remaining 27 matches in the regular season played in New South Wales.

=== League table ===
Pos	Team	Pld	W	D	L	GF	GA	GD	Pts	Qualification
1	Sydney FC (C)	26	16	5	5	49	25	+24	53	Qualification for 2021 AFC Champions League group stage and Finals series (Note: All Australian teams withdrew from the 2021 AFC Champions League on 4 June 2021.) (Note: The top two teams enter the Finals series at the semi-finals, while the teams ranked third to sixth enter the Finals series at the elimination-finals.)
2	Melbourne City	26	14	5	7	49	37	+12	47	Qualification for 2021 AFC Champions League qualifying play-offs and Finals series
3	Wellington Phoenix (Note: Wellington Phoenix cannot qualify for the 2021 AFC Champions League as they are not recognised as an AFC club.)	26	12	5	9	38	33	+5	41	Qualification for Finals series
4	Brisbane Roar	26	11	7	8	29	28	+1	40	Qualification for 2021 AFC Champions League qualifying play-offs and Finals series
5	Western United	26	12	3	11	46	37	+9	39	Qualification for Finals series
6	Perth Glory	26	10	7	9	43	36	+7	37	Qualification for Finals series
7	Adelaide United	26	11	3	12	44	49	−5	36	
8	Newcastle Jets	26	9	7	10	32	40	−8	34	
9	Western Sydney Wanderers	26	9	6	11	35	40	−5	33	
10	Melbourne Victory	26	6	5	15	33	44	−11	23	
11	Central Coast Mariners	26	5	3	18	26	55	−29	18	

Source: A-Leagues
Rules for classification: 1) points; 2) goal difference; 3) number of goals scored.
(C) Champions

=== Results ===
Home \ Away	ADE	BRI	CCM	MCY	MVC	NEW	PER	SYD	WEL	WSW	WUN	ADE	BRI	CCM	MCY	MVC	NEW	PER	SYD	WEL	WSW	WUN
Adelaide United		1–0	2–0	3–1	3–1	2–1	5–3	2–3	1–2	2–3	1–5					1–0	0–3		1–1			
Brisbane Roar	2–1		2–0	4–3	0–1	1–0	1–1	1–1	1–0	3–1	0–2	0–1		1–0	2–2							
Central Coast Mariners	1–3	0–1		2–4	3–2	1–1	0–3	0–3	1–3	1–3	1–0	2–1					0–0				1–1	
Melbourne City	2–1	1–0	3–1		1–2	2–0	0–3	2–0	3–2	1–1	3–2	2–2				2–1		0–0				
Melbourne Victory	2–1	1–2	2–3	0–0		4–0	1–0	0–3	1–1	1–2	2–3								1–4	0–0		1–2
Newcastle Jets	1–2	1–1	4–3	0–4	1–1		1–1	1–2	3–0	2–0	0–0				2–1			2–1				1–0
Perth Glory	3–0	1–1	1–2	2–3	2–2	6–2		1–3	4–2	2–0	0–2			1–0		0–4				1–2		
Sydney FC	2–1	5–1	1–0	2–1	2–1	4–1	0–0		2–1	0–1	1–2		1–0				1–2			3–1		
Wellington Phoenix	1–1	2–1	2–1	1–0	3–0	2–1	1–2	2–2		2–1	0–1		1–1								2–0	2–0
Western Sydney Wanderers	5–2	0–0	2–1	2–3	2–1	1–1	0–1	1–0	1–0		1–1		1–2					1–3	1–1			
Western United	3–4	0–1	3–0	1–2	3–1	0–1	1–1	0–2	1–3	2–1				6–2	1–3						5–3	

Source: A-League
Legend: Blue = home team win; Yellow = draw; Red = away team win.
For upcoming matches, an "a" indicates there is an article about the rivalry between the two participants.

== Finals series ==
Elimination-finals
22 August – Sydney
Wellington Phoenix	0
Perth Glory	1
23 August – Sydney
Brisbane Roar	0
Western United	1

Semi-finals
26 August – Sydney
Sydney FC	2
Perth Glory	0
26 August – Sydney
Melbourne City	2
Western United	0

Grand Final
30 August – Sydney
Sydney FC (a.e.t.)	1
Melbourne City	0

=== Elimination-finals ===
22 August 2020
17:00 AEST

Wellington Phoenix	0–1	Perth Glory
	Report	Chianese 18'

Bankwest Stadium, Sydney
Attendance: 0 (behind closed doors)
Referee: Alex King
23 August 2020
18:00 AEST

Brisbane Roar	0–1	Western United
	Report	Diamanti 21'

Bankwest Stadium, Sydney
Attendance: 0 (behind closed doors)
Referee: Chris Beath

=== Semi-finals ===
26 August 2020
17:00 AEST

Melbourne City	2–0	Western United
Maclaren 68' (pen.); Imai 84' (o.g.)	Report

Bankwest Stadium, Sydney
Attendance: 1,897
Referee: Alireza Faghani
26 August 2020
20:00 AEST

Sydney FC	2–0	Perth Glory
Ninković 24'; Le Fondre 28'	Report

Bankwest Stadium, Sydney
Attendance: 3,477
Referee: Alex King

=== Grand Final ===
30 August 2020
18:30 AEST

Sydney FC	1–0 (a.e.t.)	Melbourne City
Grant 100'	Report

Bankwest Stadium, Sydney
Attendance: 7,051
Referee: Chris Beath

== Statistics ==
=== Attendances ===
==== By club ====
These are the attendance records of each of the teams at the end of the home and away season. The table does not include finals series attendances.

As of matches played on 14 March 2020.

Team	Hosted	Average	High	Low	Total
Melbourne Victory	10	17,366	33,523	12,023	173,662
Western Sydney Wanderers	9	13,729	28,519	9,090	123,559
Sydney FC	10	12,110	18,501	4,099	121,096
Brisbane Roar	10	9,388	12,859	4,121	93,876
Wellington Phoenix	11	8,477	12,198	6,074	93,244
Melbourne City	11	8,397	18,038	2,292	92,363
Perth Glory	9	8,382	11,168	6,177	75,438
Adelaide United	11	8,326	15,347	4,286	91,588
Newcastle Jets	10	7,386	9,154	4,151	73,864
Western United	11	5,653	10,128	2,973	62,185
Central Coast Mariners	10	5,504	8,910	3,773	55,038
League total	112	9,428	33,523	2,292	1,055,913

==== By round ====
2019–20 A-League Attendance
Round	Total	Games	Avg. Per Game
Round 1	78,600	5	15,720
Round 2	52,966	5	10,593
Round 3	63,373	5	12,675
Round 4	60,180	5	12,036
Round 5	41,585	5	8,317
Round 6	36,964	4	9,241
Round 7	44,882	5	8,976
Round 8	44,395	5	8,879
Round 9	42,443	5	8,489
Round 10	45,171	5	9,034
Round 11	50,314	5	10,063
Round 12	45,534	5	9,107
Round 13	53,061	5	10,612
Round 14	43,997	5	8,799
Round 15	43,366	5	8,673
Round 16	42,947	5	8,589
Round 17	37,738	5	7,548
Round 18	55,717	5	11,143
Round 19	35,300	4	8,825
Round 20	38,227	5	7,645
Round 21	33,032	4	8,258
Round 22	43,804	5	8,761
Round 23	22,317	5	4,463
Elimination finals	0	2	0
Semifinals	5,374	2	2,687
Grand final	7,051	1	7,051

=== Club membership ===
2019–20 A-League membership figures
Club	Members
Adelaide United	7,138
Brisbane Roar	9,883
Central Coast Mariners	6,821
Melbourne City	11,968
Melbourne Victory	23,633
Newcastle Jets	10,344
Perth Glory	10,278
Sydney FC	14,026
Wellington Phoenix	6,625
Western Sydney Wanderers	17,325
Western United	4,786
Total	122,827
Average	11,166

Last updated: 22 January 2020.
Source: a-league.com.au

=== Player stats ===
==== Top scorers ====
Including Finals matches

Rank	Player	Club	Goals
1	(Australia) Jamie Maclaren	Melbourne City	23
2	(England) Adam Le Fondre	Sydney FC	21
3	(Kosovo) Besart Berisha	Western United	19
4	(Australia) Mitchell Duke	Western Sydney Wanderers	14
5	(Uruguay) Bruno Fornaroli	Perth Glory	13
6	(Mexico) Ulises Dávila	Wellington Phoenix	12
7	(Australia) Riley McGree	Adelaide United	10
7	(Republic of Ireland) Roy O'Donovan	Brisbane Roar, Newcastle Jets	10
7	(Sweden) Ola Toivonen	Melbourne Victory	10
10	(Australia) Ben Halloran	Adelaide United	9

==== Hat-tricks ====
Player	For	Against	Result	Date	Ref.
(Australia) Jamie Maclaren	Melbourne City	Brisbane Roar	3–4	17 November 2019	
(Republic of Ireland) Roy O'Donovan	Brisbane Roar	Melbourne City	4–3	17 November 2019	
(England) Adam Le Fondre	Sydney FC	Brisbane Roar	5–1	7 December 2019	
(Australia) Max Burgess	Western United	Central Coast Mariners	6–2	1 March 2020	
(Australia) Jamie Maclaren	Melbourne City	Central Coast Mariners	4–2	20 March 2020	

==== Own goals ====
Player	Club	Against	Round
(Australia) Dino Djulbic	Perth Glory	Sydney FC	7
(Australia) Harrison Delbridge	Melbourne City	Perth Glory	9
(England) Steven Taylor	Wellington Phoenix	Sydney FC	11
(Australia) Luke DeVere	Wellington Phoenix	Central Coast Mariners	13
(Australia) Matthew Millar	Newcastle Jets	Melbourne Victory	13
(Australia) Kye Rowles	Central Coast Mariners	Melbourne Victory	14
(Australia) Kye Rowles	Central Coast Mariners	Western United	15
(South Korea) Kim Eun-sun	Central Coast Mariners	Newcastle Jets	18
(England) Jamie Young	Brisbane Roar	Melbourne City	21

==== Clean sheets ====
Including Finals matches

Rank	Player	Club	Clean sheets
1	(Australia) Liam Reddy	Perth Glory	9
2	(Australia) Andrew Redmayne	Sydney FC	8
3	(Poland) Filip Kurto	Western United	6
3	(England) Jamie Young	Brisbane Roar	6
5	(New Zealand) Stefan Marinovic	Wellington Phoenix	5
5	(Australia) Lawrence Thomas	Melbourne Victory	5
7	(Australia) Tom Glover	Melbourne City	4
7	(Australia) Lewis Italiano	Newcastle Jets	4
7	(Australia) Paul Izzo	Adelaide United	4
10	(Australia) Dean Bouzanis	Melbourne City	3
10	(Switzerland) Daniel Lopar	Western Sydney Wanderers	3

== Awards ==
The NAB Young Footballer of the Year Award will be awarded to the finest performance of an under-23 player from Australia or New Zealand throughout the season.

=== Monthly awards ===
Month	Coach of the Month		Player of the Month		Nominee for Young Footballer of the Year	
Month	Manager	Club	Player	Club	Player	Club
October	(Germany) Markus Babbel	Western Sydney Wanderers	(Switzerland) Daniel Lopar	Western Sydney Wanderers	(Australia) Riley McGree	Adelaide United
November	(Scotland) Ernie Merrick	Newcastle Jets	(Mexico) Ulises Davila	Wellington Phoenix	(Australia) Angus Thurgate	Newcastle Jets
December	(Australia) Ufuk Talay	Wellington Phoenix	(Australia) Cameron Devlin	Wellington Phoenix	(Australia) Reno Piscopo	Wellington Phoenix
January	(England) Robbie Fowler	Brisbane Roar	(Switzerland) Gregory Wüthrich	Perth Glory	(Australia) Cameron Devlin	Wellington Phoenix
February	(England) Robbie Fowler	Brisbane Roar	(England) David Ball	Wellington Phoenix	(Australia) Nicholas D'Agostino	Perth Glory
March					(Australia) Matthew Millar	Newcastle Jets
July/August					(Australia) Tom Glover	Melbourne City

=== Annual awards ===
The following end of the season awards were announced at the 2019–20 Dolan Warren Awards night on 10 September 2020.

- Johnny Warren Medal – Alessandro Diamanti, Western United
- NAB Young Footballer of the Year – Riley McGree, Adelaide United
- Nike Golden Boot Award – Jamie Maclaren, Melbourne City (22 goals)
- Goalkeeper of the Year – Andrew Redmayne, Sydney FC
- Coach of the Year – Erick Mombaerts, Melbourne City
- Fair Play Award – Sydney FC
- Referee of the Year – Chris Beath
- Goal of the Year – Nikolai Topor-Stanley, Newcastle Jets (Newcastle Jets v Perth Glory, 29 February 2020)

Team of the Season
Goalkeeper	(England) Jamie Young (Brisbane Roar)					
Defenders	(Australia) Rhyan Grant (Sydney FC)		(Australia) Alex Wilkinson (Sydney FC)	(Denmark) Michael Jakobsen (Adelaide United)		(New Zealand) Liberato Cacace (Wellington Phoenix)
Midfielders	(Mexico) Ulises Dávila (Wellington Phoenix)		(Australia) Luke Brattan (Sydney FC)		(Italy) Alessandro Diamanti (Western United)	
Forwards	(Kosovo) Besart Berisha (Western United)		(Australia) Jamie Maclaren (Melbourne City)		(England) Adam Le Fondre (Sydney FC)	
Substitutes	(Australia) Paul Izzo (Adelaide United)	(England) Steven Taylor (Wellington Phoenix)	(Serbia) Miloš Ninković (Sydney FC)	(Australia) Riley McGree (Adelaide United)	(Australia) Mitchell Duke (Western Sydney Wanderers)	

== See also ==
- 2019–20 Adelaide United FC season
- 2019–20 Brisbane Roar FC season
- 2019–20 Central Coast Mariners FC season
- 2019–20 Melbourne City FC season
- 2019–20 Melbourne Victory FC season
- 2019–20 Newcastle Jets FC season
- 2019–20 Perth Glory FC season
- 2019–20 Sydney FC season
- 2019–20 Wellington Phoenix FC season
- 2019–20 Western Sydney Wanderers FC season
- 2019–20 Western United FC season
