= Carlos Pérez Salvachúa =

Spanish football manager (born 1973)

Personal information
- Date of birth: 30 April 1973 (age 53)
- Place of birth: Madrid, Spain

Team information
- Current team: Alcalá (manager)

Managerial career
- Years: Team
- 1997–1999: Conquense (assistant)
- 1999–2005: Real Madrid (youth)
- 2005–2006: Conquense
- 2007–2009: Guadalajara (assistant)
- 2009: Guadalajara
- 2009–2013: Guadalajara (assistant)
- 2013–2015: Guadalajara
- 2015–2017: Villarreal C
- 2017: Valladolid B
- 2018–2020: Melbourne Victory (assistant)
- 2020: Melbourne Victory (caretaker)
- 2020: Sint-Truiden (assistant)
- 2021: Las Rozas
- 2021–2022: Tudelano
- 2022–: Alcalá

Carlos Pérez Salvachúa (born 30 April 1973) is a Spanish football manager, currently in charge of Alcalá.

== Managerial career ==
A UEFA Pro Licence holder, Salvachúa began his career with Real Madrid C.F. at La Fábrica, in which he spent six seasons. Salvachua was an integral part of the coaching staff, overseeing the development of several high-profile players during his coaching tenure. Working in both senior head coach and assistant roles, he won four league championships and achieved promotion twice during his time in Europe.

After spending time managing Segunda División B club UB Conquense, as well as serving as a scout for Villarreal CF youth, Salvachúa joined CD Guadalajara in 2007, where he would remain until June 2015, serving assistant coach and manager roles during his time with the club. Salvachúa guided Guadalajara to the final of the 2013–14 Copa Federación de España and to the promotional playoffs in the 2014–15 season.

At the conclusion of his time at Guadalajara, Salvachúa returned to Villarreal as manager of Villarreal CF C, replacing Javier Torres Gómez. In July 2017, after two seasons with Villarreal CF C, he was appointed manager of Real Valladolid Promesas for the 2017–18 season. In September 2017, he resigned from his position.

In July 2018, Salvachúa joined Melbourne Victory FC as an assistant coach to Kevin Muscat. After Muscat's departure in 2019, he remained with the club under Marco Kurz. After Kurz was dismissed in January 2020, Salvachúa was appointed caretaker manager until the conclusion of the season. However, on 30 May 2020, with five regular season A-League matches remaining in Melbourne Victory's season, Salvachúa departed the club to return to Europe to be closer to his family.

In June 2020, Salvachúa joined Belgian First Division A club Sint-Truidense V.V. as an assistant coach.

In April 2021, Salvachúa became the manager of Las Rozas CF.

On 14 October 2021, Salvachúa became the manager of CD Tudelano of the Primera División RFEF, after the dismissal of Javier Olaizola. He left Tudelano at the end of the 2021–22 season. In October 2023, he was appointed manager of RSD Alcalá.

== Managerial statistics ==
As of 2 March 2020

Team	Nat	From	To	Record				
Team	Nat	From	To	G	W	D	L	Win %
CD Guadalajara	(Spain)	1 July 2013	30 June 2015	76	32	25	19	42.11
Real Valladolid Promesas	(Spain)	1 July 2017	18 September 2017	5	0	1	4	0.00
Melbourne Victory (caretaker)	(Australia)	15 January 2020	30 May 2020	12	4	2	6	33.33
Total				93	36	28	29	38.71
