= Kristian Popovic =

Australian association football player

Kristian Popović
Personal information
- Full name: Kristian Popović
- Date of birth: 14 August 2001 (age 25)
- Place of birth: Sydney, Australia
- Position: Defensive midfielder

Team information
- Current team: Central Coast Mariners
- Number: 29

Youth career
- Sydney United 58
- Western Sydney Wanderers
- 2018–2019: Perth Glory

Senior career*
Years	Team	Apps	(Gls)
2019	Perth Glory NPL	8	(0)
2019–2020	Perth Glory	19	(2)
2020–2021	Xanthi	2	(0)
2021–2022	NK Rudeš	5	(0)
2021–2022	→ NK Kurilovec (loan)	5	(0)
2022–2023	NK Međimurje	13	(0)
2023–2026	Macarthur	16	(0)
2026–	Central Coast Mariners	0	(0)

International career^{‡}
2019	Australia U-20	4	(0)
2021	Australia U-23	2	(0)
Medal record
Men's football
Representing Australia
AFF U-19 Youth Championship
First place	2019 Vietnam	U-20 Team
- * Club domestic league appearances and goals as of 28 May 2026 ‡ National team caps and goals as of 30 July 2021

Kristian Popović (Croatian: [pǒpovit͡ɕ]; born 14 August 2001) is an Australian professional footballer who plays as a defensive midfielder for Central Coast Mariners.

== Club career ==
On 18 April 2019, at 17 years of age, Kristian Popovic made his first appearance for Perth Glory coming on as a substitute for Jake Brimmer. On 19 October 2019, Popovic scored his first professional goal, coming against Western United in a 1–1 draw.

Popovic played for A-League Men side Macarthur from 2023 to 2026.

In July 2026, Popovic joined Central Coast Mariners.

== Personal life ==
Popović is the son of former Crystal Palace and Socceroos player, and current Socceroos coach, Tony Popović, and the older brother of footballer Gabriel Popović.

== Honours ==
Australia U20

- AFF U-19 Youth Championship: 2019
