= 2020 A-League finals series =

A-League finals series
- Season: 2019–20
- Dates: 22–30 August 2020
- Champions: Sydney FC
- Matches: 5
- Goals: 7 (1.4 per match)
- Top goalscorer: 6 players (1 goal)
- Highest scoring: Melbourne City 2–0 Western United (Semi-finals, 26 August 2020); Sydney FC 2–0 Perth Glory (Semi-finals, 26 August 2020)
- Highest attendance: 7,051; Sydney FC 1–0 Melbourne City (Grand Final, 30 August 2020)
- Lowest attendance: 1,897; Melbourne City 2–0 Western United (Semi-finals, 26 August 2020)
- Total attendance: 12,425
- Average attendance: 4,142

The 2020 A-League finals series was the 15th annual edition of the A-League finals series, the Australian playoffs tournament staged to determine the champion of the 2019–20 A-League season. The series was played over three weeks culminating in the 2020 A-League Grand Final, where Sydney FC won a record fifth championship 1–0 against Melbourne City.

The series was impacted by the COVID-19 pandemic in Australia, where the entire finals series was played at Bankwest Stadium (now CommBank Stadium) under the New South Wales hub, and forced the elimination-finals to be played behind closed doors and semi-finals onwards to be restricted in capacity.

== Qualification ==
Pos	Team	Pld	W	D	L	GF	GA	GD	Pts	Qualification
1	Sydney FC (C)	26	16	5	5	49	25	+24	53	Qualification for 2021 AFC Champions League group stage and Finals series (Note: All Australian teams withdrew from the 2021 AFC Champions League on 4 June 2021.) (Note: The top two teams enter the Finals series at the semi-finals, while the teams ranked third to sixth enter the Finals series at the elimination-finals.)
2	Melbourne City	26	14	5	7	49	37	+12	47	Qualification for 2021 AFC Champions League qualifying play-offs and Finals series
3	Wellington Phoenix (Note: Wellington Phoenix cannot qualify for the 2021 AFC Champions League as they are not recognised as an AFC club.)	26	12	5	9	38	33	+5	41	Qualification for Finals series
4	Brisbane Roar	26	11	7	8	29	28	+1	40	Qualification for 2021 AFC Champions League qualifying play-offs and Finals series
5	Western United	26	12	3	11	46	37	+9	39	Qualification for Finals series
6	Perth Glory	26	10	7	9	43	36	+7	37	Qualification for Finals series
7	Adelaide United	26	11	3	12	44	49	−5	36	
8	Newcastle Jets	26	9	7	10	32	40	−8	34	
9	Western Sydney Wanderers	26	9	6	11	35	40	−5	33	
10	Melbourne Victory	26	6	5	15	33	44	−11	23	
11	Central Coast Mariners	26	5	3	18	26	55	−29	18	

Source: A-Leagues
Rules for classification: 1) points; 2) goal difference; 3) number of goals scored.
(C) Champions

== Venues ==
Sydney	2020 A-League finals series is located in Australia
Bankwest Stadium	2020 A-League finals series is located in Australia
Capacity: 30,000	2020 A-League finals series is located in Australia

== Matches ==
The system used for the 2020 A-League finals series is the modified top-six play-offs by the A-Leagues. The top two teams enter the two-legged semi-finals receiving the bye for the elimination-finals in which the teams from third placed to sixth place enter the elimination-finals with "third against sixth" and "fourth against fifth". Losers for the elimination finals are eliminated, and winners qualify for the semi-finals.

The first-placed team in the semi-finals plays the lowest-ranked elimination-final winning team and second placed team in the semi-finals plays the highest-ranked elimination-final winner. Usually, the home-state advantage goes to the team with the higher ladder position but all matches were changed to neutral hub matches due to the COVID-19 pandemic in Australia.

Elimination-finals
22 August – Sydney
Wellington Phoenix	0
Perth Glory	1
23 August – Sydney
Brisbane Roar	0
Western United	1

Semi-finals
26 August – Sydney
Sydney FC	2
Perth Glory	0
26 August – Sydney
Melbourne City	2
Western United	0

Grand Final
30 August – Sydney
Sydney FC (a.e.t.)	1
Melbourne City	0

=== Elimination-finals ===
Third-placed Wellington Phoenix won their most recent clash against sixth-placed Perth Glory, ahead of this elimination final between the two. Joel Chianese scored the only goal of the match, to send Perth Glory through to the semi-final against Sydney FC.

22 August 2020
17:00 AEST

Wellington Phoenix	0–1	Perth Glory
	Report	Chianese 18'

Bankwest Stadium, Sydney
Attendance: 0 (behind closed doors)
Referee: Alex King

Fourth-placed Brisbane Roar went up against fifth-placed inaugural club Western United. Alessandro Diamanti scored a free kick goal, and won 1–0 for Western United, sending them through to the semi-final against Melbourne City.

23 August 2020
18:00 AEST

Brisbane Roar	0–1	Western United
	Report	Diamanti 21'

Bankwest Stadium, Sydney
Attendance: 0 (behind closed doors)
Referee: Chris Beath

=== Semi-finals ===
Melbourne City won all three matches against Western United in the regular season, ahead of this semi-final between the two. City won 2–0 thanks to a penalty goal by Jamie Maclaren and an own goal by Tomoki Imai, to send them through to their first ever Grand Final.

26 August 2020
17:00 AEST

Melbourne City	2–0	Western United
Maclaren 68' (pen.); Imai 84' (o.g.)	Report

Bankwest Stadium, Sydney
Attendance: 1,897
Referee: Alireza Faghani

Sydney FC and Perth Glory met in this semi-final; the same teams as the previous grand finalists from the 2019 A-League Grand Final. Sydney won 2–0 through goals by Miloš Ninković and Adam Le Fondre, heading for the Grand Final.

26 August 2020
20:00 AEST

Sydney FC	2–0	Perth Glory
Ninković 24'; Le Fondre 28'	Report

Bankwest Stadium, Sydney
Attendance: 3,477
Referee: Alex King

=== Grand Final ===
Defending champions Sydney FC were looking for a record fifth Australian national league championship, against first-timers Melbourne City looking for their first championship. City who looked to have scored the opening goal by Harrison Delbridge, was ruled out offside until the match ended goalless after 90 minutes. In extra time, Rhyan Grant scored in the 100th minute with his second Grand Final goal and won the match for Sydney winning a record fifth championship.

30 August 2020
18:30 AEST

Sydney FC	1–0 (a.e.t.)	Melbourne City
Grant 100'	Report

Bankwest Stadium, Sydney
Attendance: 7,051
Referee: Chris Beath
