= Marco Kurz =

German footballer (born 1969)

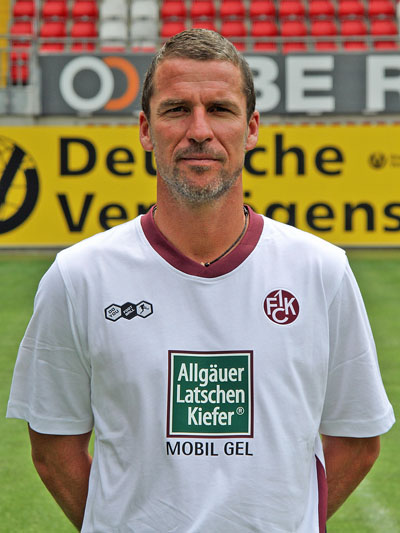
- Kurz with 1. FC Kaiserslautern in 2011

Personal information
- Date of birth: 16 May 1969 (age 57)
- Place of birth: Stuttgart, West Germany
- Height: 1.85 m (6 ft 1 in)
- Position: Defender

Youth career
- –1988: SV Sillenbuch

Senior career*
Years	Team	Apps	(Gls)
1989–1990	VfB Stuttgart	1	(0)
1990–1994	1. FC Nürnberg	108	(0)
1994–1995	Borussia Dortmund	4	(0)
1995–1998	Schalke 04	58	(0)
1998–2004	1860 Munich	129	(5)
2004–2005	SC Pfullendorf	12	(0)
Total		311	(5)

Managerial career
- 2005–2006: SC Pfullendorf
- 2006–2007: 1860 Munich II
- 2007–2009: 1860 Munich
- 2009–2012: 1. FC Kaiserslautern
- 2013: TSG Hoffenheim
- 2013: Ingolstadt 04
- 2015–2016: Fortuna Düsseldorf
- 2017–2019: Adelaide United
- 2019–2020: Melbourne Victory
- * Club domestic league appearances and goals

Marco Kurz (born 16 May 1969) is a German football manager and former player who played as a defender. He last managed Australian side Melbourne Victory.

== Playing career ==
Kurz, who played as a defender, started playing football at SV Sillenbuch, a small club in his native Stuttgart, and then for VfL Sindelfingen. At age 20, he had his breakthrough into professional football, when he signed a contract for his local Bundesliga side VfB Stuttgart in the summer of 1989. After one year, where he—with the exception of one cap—only played for VfB's second team, he was transferred to 1. FC Nürnberg in 1990; there he was more successful, earning 108 caps in four seasons. When the team was relegated to the 2. Bundesliga after the 1993–94 season, Kurz took up an offer by Borussia Dortmund. Dortmund won the title of German champion in the following season, with Kurz playing four times.

At rival club Schalke 04, where Kurz subsequently played from 1995 to 1998, he earned 58 caps. With Schalke he won his biggest title, the 1996–97 UEFA Cup, under coach Huub Stevens. In 1998, he transferred to the south of Germany again, joining 1860 Munich. He played 128 times for 1860 Munich until 2004, when the club was relegated to the 2. Bundesliga.

2004–05 was Kurz's last season as a player. He spent it at SC Pfullendorf, a Regionalliga Süd (then third division) team (11 caps). Shortly after joining Pfullendorf, he was promoted to player-coach; in 2005, he retired as a player, but stayed at Pfullendorf as head coach.

== Managerial career ==
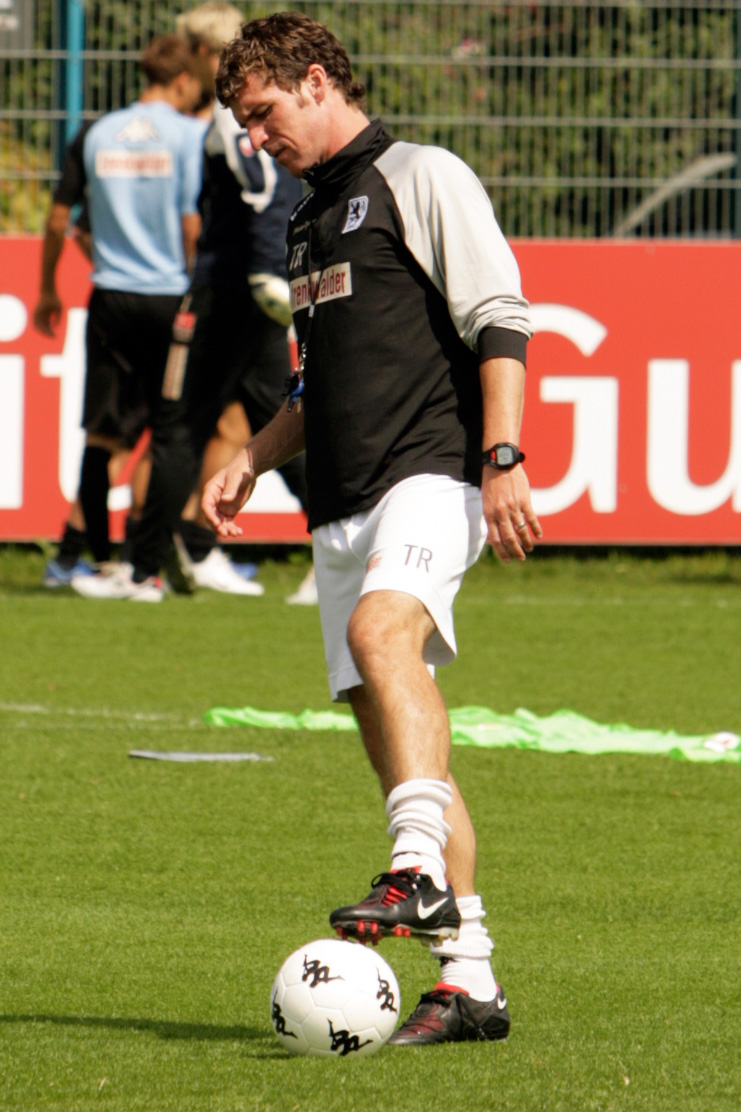
Kurz with TSV 1860 Munich in 2007

After managing SC Pfullendorf, Kurz returned to 1860 Munich as a manager for the second team (Regionalliga Süd). In March 2007, he was promoted to head coach of the first team. 1860 Munich sacked Kurz in February 2009.

Kurz joined 1. FC Kaiserslautern in June 2009. He won promotion to the Bundesliga for the club in 2010. The subsequent 2010–11 season was changeable and most of the time, FCK was threatened by relegation, but eventually they finished a sensational seventh in the German top flight—their best finish in the bundesliga since 1998–99, when they finished fifth. 2011–12 was much worse, with Kaiserslautern occupying a relegation berth virtually all season. As a result, Kaiserslautern parted ways with coach Kurz on 20 March 2012.

On 18 December 2012, it was announced by Bundesliga side TSG Hoffenheim that Kurz would be the new head coach for the second half of the 2012–13 season, when Hoffenheim faced the threat of relegation. Hoffenheim were not able to emerge from the drop zone and decided to fire Kurz on 2 April 2013. Then, Kurz was manager of Ingolstadt 04 between 9 June 2013 and 30 September 2013.

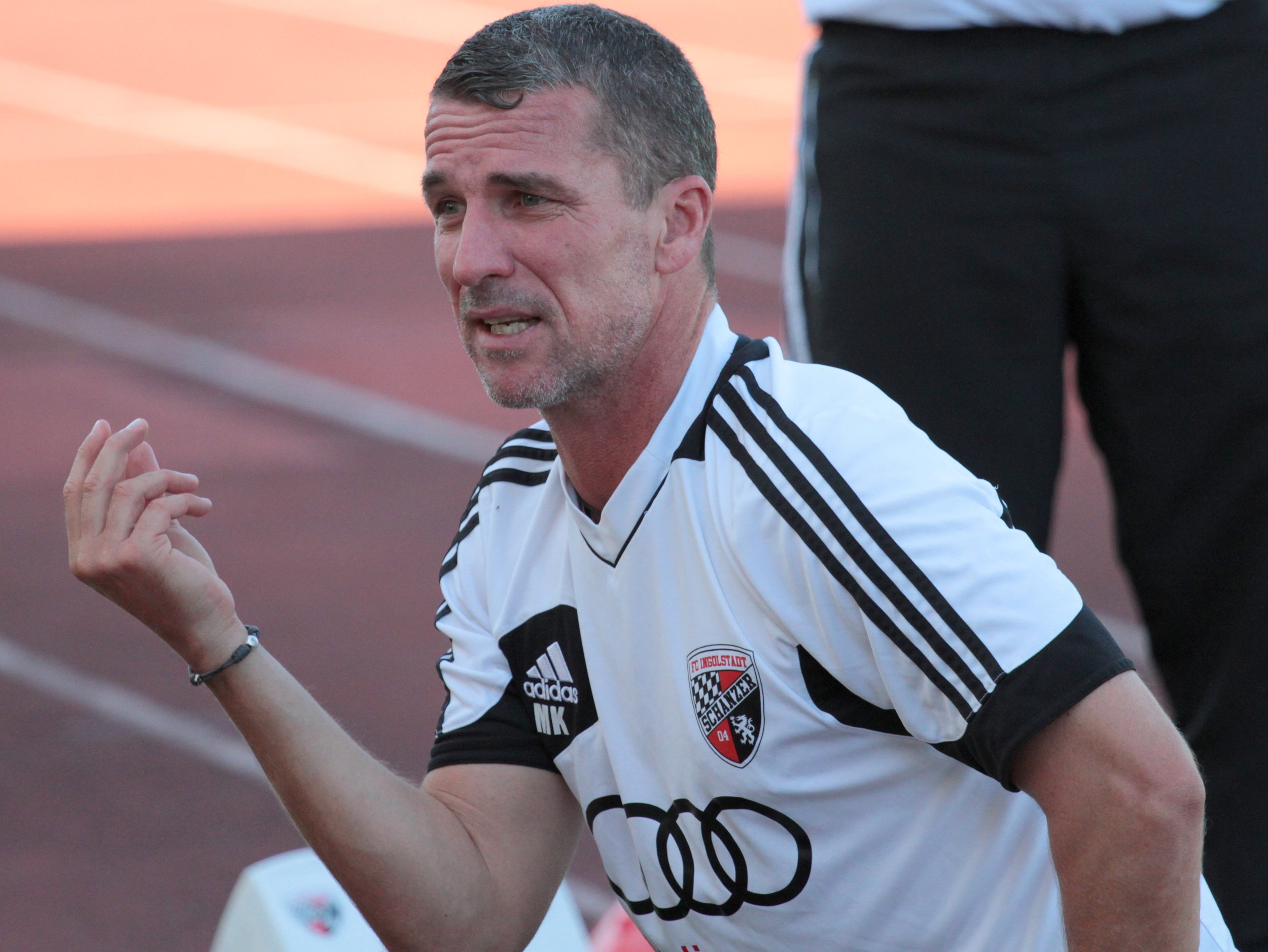
Kurz coaching Ingolstadt in 2013

He was named the head coach of Fortuna Düsseldorf on 23 December 2015. After scoring four points in seven games, Kurz was sacked on 13 March 2016.

On 16 June 2017, Kurz was appointed head coach of A-League club Adelaide United. He won his first competitive match as manager for Adelaide United on 9 August 2017 in the round of 32 of the FFA Cup defeating the Newcastle Jets 1–0. He made his A-League managerial debut on 8 October 2017 against Wellington Phoenix with the result being a draw at 1–1. Kurz helped Adelaide reach the final of the 2017 FFA Cup against Sydney FC on 21 November 2017 after defeating Western Sydney Wanderers 2–1 in the semi-finals; they went on to lose 1–2 after extra time. In 2018, Kurz led Adelaide United to their second FFA Cup triumph, defeating Sydney FC 2–1.

On 28 June 2019, Kurz was appointed manager of A-League side Melbourne Victory on a two-year deal, after their previous manager, Kevin Muscat, stepped down.

In January 2020, after six months in the role, Kurz was dismissed by Melbourne Victory; this was the third-fastest coaching dismissal in A-League history. Kurz left having managed the Victory for just 13 matches, for four wins, three draws and six losses; the six defeats were the most losses the Victory had suffered after 13 games of a season. At the time of his dismissal, Victory were sixth in the league with 15 points, their equal-lowest points tally after 13 games alongside the 2007–08 and 2011–12 seasons. He was replaced by Victory assistant coach Carlos Pérez Salvachúa.

== Managerial statistics ==
As of match played 5 January 2020

Team	From	To	Record							
Team	From	To	G	W	D	L	GF	GA	GD	Win %
SC Pfullendorf	20 April 2005	30 June 2006	43	14	11	18	38	46	−8	32.56
1860 Munich II	1 July 2006	19 March 2007	24	5	13	6	31	32	−1	20.83
1860 Munich	19 March 2007	24 February 2009	74	25	21	28	94	96	−2	33.78
1. FC Kaiserslautern	18 June 2009	20 March 2012	100	42	26	32	137	119	+18	42.00
TSG Hoffenheim	18 December 2012	2 April 2013	10	2	2	6	7	11	−4	20.00
Ingolstadt 04	10 June 2013	30 September 2013	11	3	1	7	14	19	−5	27.27
Fortuna Düsseldorf	23 December 2015	13 March 2016	7	1	1	5	6	11	−5	14.29
Adelaide United	16 June 2017	10 May 2019	67	33	14	20	98	79	+19	49.25
Melbourne Victory	28 June 2019	14 January 2020	15	4	3	8	17	18	−1	26.67
Total			351	129	92	130	442	431	+11	36.75

== Honours ==
=== Player ===
Borussia Dortmund

- Bundesliga: 1994–95
- DFL-Supercup: 1995

Schalke 04

- UEFA Cup: 1996–97

=== Manager ===
1. FC Kaiserslautern

- 2. Bundesliga: 2009–10

Adelaide United

- FFA Cup: 2018
