= Miloš Ninković =

Serbian footballer (born 1984)

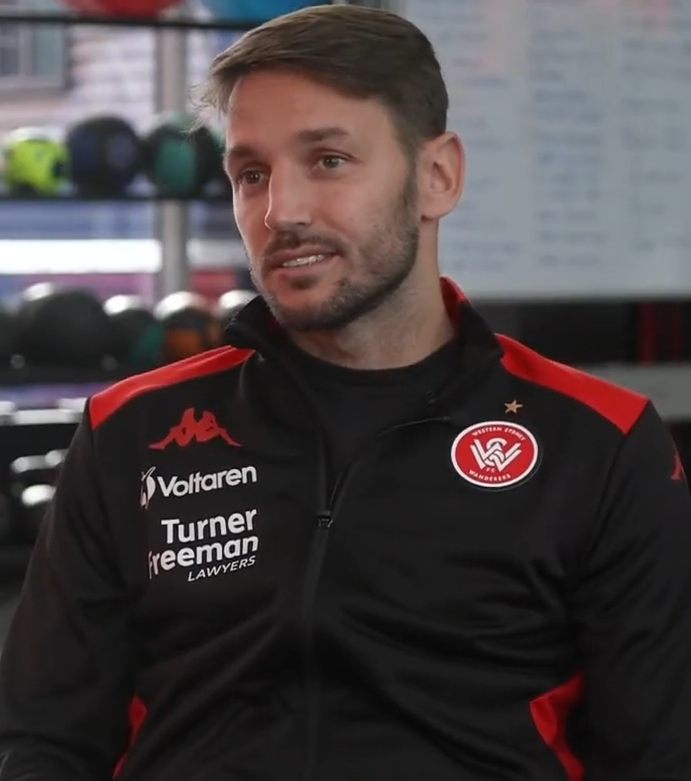
- Ninković with Western Sydney Wanderers in 2022

Personal information
- Date of birth: 25 December 1984 (age 41)
- Place of birth: Belgrade, SR Serbia, SFR Yugoslavia
- Height: 1.81 m (5 ft 11 in)
- Position: Midfielder

Senior career*
Years	Team	Apps	(Gls)
2002–2004	Čukarički	46	(6)
2004–2013	Dynamo Kyiv	109	(14)
2004–2005	→ Dynamo-2 Kyiv (loan)	14	(3)
2013	→ Évian (loan)	17	(1)
2013–2014	Red Star Belgrade	27	(5)
2014–2015	Évian	15	(0)
2015	→ Évian II (loan)	4	(0)
2015–2022	Sydney FC	181	(35)
2022–2024	Western Sydney Wanderers	35	(0)
Total		448	(64)

International career
2009–2012	Serbia	28	(0)
- * Club domestic league appearances and goals

Miloš Ninković (Serbian Cyrillic: Милош Нинковић; born 25 December 1984) is a Serbian former professional footballer who played as an attacking midfielder.

== Club career ==
=== Early career ===
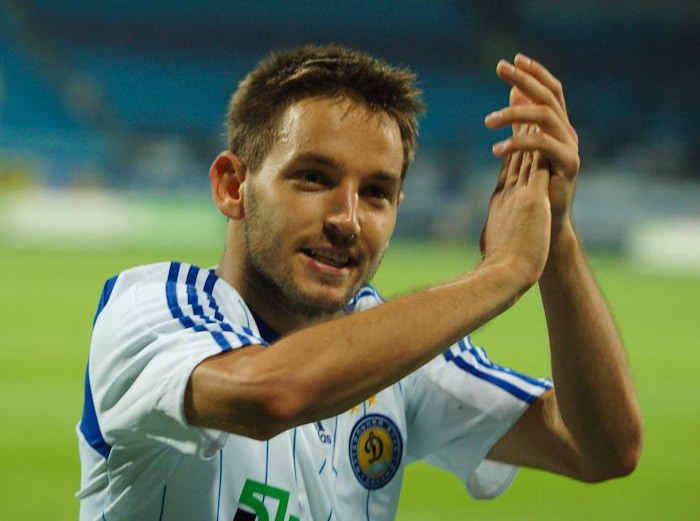
Ninković playing for Dynamo Kyiv in 2009.

At a young age, Ninković joined FK Čukarički's youth academy and later graduated into its first team. He left Čukarički as a teenager to join Dynamo Kyiv.

At the age of 19, Ninković initially struggled for playing time in Dynamo Kyiv. He gradually became a mainstay of the side, helping them win the Ukrainian Premier League three times and the domestic cup twice. The performances were noticed by then-coach of Serbia national team, Radomir Antić, and Ninković became a regular for the Serbia national team. In the 2010–11 season, he was considered one of Dynamo's most crucial and talented players. Some teammates described him as having an "eye for goal" and being a optimistic footballer.

In December 2012, Ninković was announced to be sent on loan to French club Évian. He initially was negotiating a transfer to Red Star Belgrade, but denied the possibility to reduce his contract with Dynamo from June 2013 to January 2013. Over one week after his loan move to Évian was announced, Ninković told B92 that Red Star remained a fallback option for him, suggesting an eventual transfer to Red Star Belgrade after his contract and loan expire in June 2013.

=== Serbia and Australia ===
On 4 July 2013, Ninković signed a one-year contract with an option for one additional year for Red Star Belgrade. He scored his first goals for the club on 17 August 2013, a brace against FK Jagodina.

=== Sydney FC ===
On 16 July 2015, Ninković signed a two-year contract with Sydney FC. Ninković was given the number 10 shirt at Sydney FC – the first to wear the number since Alessandro Del Piero. His signing also led to fellow Serb Milos Dimitrijevic to extend his contract with the club.

==== 2015–17: Arrival and league champions ====
Ninković made his debut as a substitute in a 2–1 away loss against Adelaide United in the FFA Cup on 26 August. On 10 October, he made his league debut at home in a 1–1 draw against Melbourne City. Two weeks later, Ninković scored his first goal in the tenth edition of the Sydney Derby, scoring the winning goal in a 1–0 victory against Western Sydney Wanderers. He added his second and third goals of the season on 2 January 2016 with two goals against Melbourne City in a 2–2 draw at AAMI Park. In March, Ninković was taken off in the first half after receiving an ankle injury during a match against Wellington Phoenix. The injury was expected to leave him out for the rest of the season but after only two weeks due to an extensive rehabilitation program, he made his return against Brisbane Roar. On 5 April, he scored the only goal in a crucial 1–0 win against Pohang Steelers in the AFC Champions League group stage. The victory secured Sydney FC's position on top of the group, leading them to qualify for the knockout stages for the first time in the club's history. Five days later, he scored a brace after coming off the bench in a 4–0 victory against Perth Glory in the final round of the competition. Ninković finished his debut season notching five assists (creating 29 key passes) and scoring four goals for Sydney FC.

The following season, Ninković scored two goals and provided two assists in five appearances, netting against Wellington Phoenix (1–0), and Newcastle Jets (2–0). His performances in October led his side unbeaten in five matches and awarded him the PFA A-League Player of the Month. On 13 November 2016, Ninković scored two goals and assisted one to win 4–1 against Perth Glory. His performance and consistency against Perth received praise from former Socceroo Mark Bosnich who said: "He is a phenomenal player but I think the most important thing this season is he's actually been showing it week in, week out". On 30 November, Ninković played in his first final, since joining Sydney FC, losing 1–0 against Melbourne City in the FFA Cup. Four days later, he scored his fifth goal of the season against Newcastle Jets.

In January 2017, Ninković continued his excellent form, scoring a goal against last season reigning double winners Adelaide United and assisting Filip Hološko to win The Big Blue derby to increase his side's unbeaten run to 17. On 1 April, Ninković was awarded the Alex Tobin Medal, being voted the best player from Fox Sports Australia after accumulating 11 Man of the Match awards during the season. On 15 April, Ninković scored a goal in a 2–0 victory against Newcastle at Allianz Stadium to win the Premiership for his club, the first they have won since 2009–10. His club also broke a league record after amassing 66 points in the league – beating Ange Postecoglou's Brisbane Roar side by a point. For his contributions and performances for his side, Ninković was awarded the Johnny Warren Medal with nine goals and eleven assists to his name, being the first Sydney FC player to do so. On 7 May, he achieved a double with Sydney FC, winning the Grand Final against rivals Melbourne Victory, via a penalty shootout with Ninković scoring the decisive penalty. After speculation of leaving, possibly to move back to Serbia, Ninković was re-signed as a marquee player for an annual salary of $1,300,000, replacing Filip Hološko who later departed. On 10 May, he was awarded the A-League Players' Player of the Year and Members' Player of the Year award – becoming the third player in Sydney FC to have won three awards in a season after Miloš Dimitrijević and Matthew Jurman. He was one of the six Sydney FC players named in the PFA team of the season.

==== 2017–18: Rise to a Sydney FC legend ====
Ninković began the 2017–18 season as a new marquee player for Sydney FC in the FFA Cup. He opened the campaign by scoring a goal in an 8–0 away victory against Darwin Rovers, setting a new record in the competition. Ninković started in the remaining games as Sydney FC advanced to the finals against Adelaide United, who beat them the last time they met in a cup final. On 21 November 2017, the game ended with Ninković opening the scoreline 1–0, putting it past Paul Izzo. The score drew level by Nikola Mileusnic, leading the match into extra time before Bobô scored the winning goal in the 110th minute. Ninković earned his third accolade with Sydney FC as the club won their first cup title in their history.

Ahead of the league season, Ninković utilised his playmaking skills, forming a partnership with new arrival Adrian Mierzejewski who added more to the attack with Alex Brosque and Bobô. On 3 January 2018, he scored a goal against Newcastle, skillfully beating four defenders and chipping the ball past Glen Moss to tie the game 1–1. The final score at Allianz Stadium was 2–2. After the match, the goal would be dubbed by Fox Sports as a goal of the season contender, and received further praise from Mark Bosnich, saying, "An absolutely special goal by a special player and once again (he) came to Sydney's rescue". In March, Ninković missed on an AFC Champions League group match against Kashima Antlers due to hamstring problems. He returned to full fitness and scored his fifth goal of the season in a 2–1 defeat against Brisbane Roar. One week later, he scored a goal in a 2–1 victory against Central Coast Mariners. On 3 April, he scored the opening goal in a crucial AFC Champions League match against Suwon Bluewings that ended with Sydney FC winning 4–1.

On 13 April, Ninković celebrated his second consecutive premiership after a 1–0 win against Melbourne Victory in the final round of the A-League. At the end of the season, his performance and influence in Australian football received praises from many media and personnel including from Australian international Miloš Degenek who stated that "Ninkovic is the most appreciated footballer in Australia. [His arrival is] the best thing that happened to Australian football," adding "He has given Australia more than Alessandro Del Piero!". On 31 May, he extended his contract for two years with Sydney FC following the departure of Graham Arnold.

==== 2018–20: Hyundai A-League ====
"He's the best number 10 we've had at the club, He is the best marquee in Australia – not Castro, he is"

— Steve Corica praises Ninković performance following the Grand Final in Perth.

Under the system of inexperienced manager Steve Corica, the 2018–19 season saw the departure of key starters, Adrian Mierzejewski and Bobô leaving Ninković as the only marquee and foreign import at the club. Whilst also applying for permanent residency in October, he was partnered in midfield with new loan signing Siem de Jong and formed a partnership in the attack with Adam Le Fondre. After a quiet first half of the season with his club staying third place, Ninković scored his first goal of the season in the Big Blue losing 2–1 at AAMI Park on 26 January 2019. By February, he accumulated 21 key passes, with six assists and scored one goal. Although he later expressed his frustration for the lack of goals he scored during the season. On 6 April, Ninković scored the winning goal in a 2–1 Big Blue derby victory against Melbourne Victory, shooting past Matthew Acton after a cut back pass from Siem de Jong. After finishing second in the league below Perth Glory, Ninković scored a brace against Melbourne Victory in the semi final, contributing to a 6–1 victory, the biggest win in the history of the Big Blue rivalry.

Ninković started in the Grand Final, against Premiers' winner Perth Glory, where his side eventually won on penalties, bringing him his second championship to Sydney. At the end of the match, Ninković was awarded the Joe Marston Medal, recognising his performance in the Grand Final. He ended his 2018–19 campaign with 3 league goals (all against Melbourne Victory), the lowest he scored in a season with Sydney FC.

On 7 August 2019, Ninković injured his ankle during a match in the FFA Cup against Brisbane Roar, suspecting it was a broken ankle. He returned to training 5 days later, only missing a friendly match against Wollongong Wolves. Ninković scored two goals in a friendly match against newly founded club Western United, netting in the 25th and 71st minute to end the game 2–1.

On 26 October 2019, Ninković started in the first Sydney Derby match of the season in front of 28,519 people in a 1–0 away loss against Western Sydney Wanderers at Western Sydney Stadium. The match would be a shock to many including Ninković as Wanderers broke a 980 days winless drought against the Sky Blues. Despite the loss, Ninković was award the Under Armour Man of the Match, creating three key passes and having a pass completion of 87.9% out of the 58 passes played during the game. On 17 December, he extended his contract for two years, rejecting a multi-deal offer from expansion side Macarthur FC. During an interview, Ninković opened up about the Macarthur transfer saying he was nearly close to signing. The offer was said to be a three-year deal with an opportunity for a coaching role at the end of his career. Further reports say that he was offered a $500,000 salary by Sydney FC before Macarthur offered a two-year deal with an option for a third, earning $750,000 per year. The transfer brought much dislike between the clubs, and in response, Sydney FC would raise the minimum ticket price to $50 for the away section in their first match against the Bulls in January 2021.

On 31 January 2020, Ninković was left out of the squad's 2020 AFC Champions League campaign due to the foreign limit for non-Asian players. By April, Ninković scored five goals with three assists, out of 31 key passes, from the 21 games he has played. Following a poor run of form, Ninković would claim his Premiers medal after a 2–1 loss against Western United in August. On 26 August, he scored in the semifinal against Perth Glory, to open the scoring of the match. The final score was against 2–0 victory at Western Sydney Stadium. The win was their first in 40 days with Ninković applauding his teammates for their efforts. He started in the Grand Final against Melbourne City, playing the full 120 minutes of the match when his club won 1–0 in extra time and claiming their fifth Grand Final victory. Ninković was voted second in the Johnny Warren Medal with 28 points, falling short to Western United player Alessandro Diamanti (34 points).

==== 2020–22: Last season ====
On 30 January, Ninković started his 2020–21 season, scoring his first goal by dribbling through four players in a 3–0 victory against Macarthur FC in their inaugural season. On 23 May, Ninković assisted the only goal, a precise lob pass for Bobô who volleyed it in the net, to win 1–0 against Western Sydney Wanderers. This would be the Sky Blue's first win against the Wanderers since 15 December 2018. On 23 June, Ninković was awarded his second Johnny Warren Medal, sharing it jointly with Wellington Phoenix's Ulises Dávila – becoming the first players to share the award. Following a calf injury that made him miss the semifinal win against Adelaide, Ninković came off the bench in the 72nd minute in a 3–1 Grand Final loss against Melbourne City on 27 June.

On 25 January 2022, Ninković scored in a 2–2 Big Blue derby draw against Melbourne Victory. On 26 February, he scored his second of the 2021–22 season in a 2–1 loss against Melbourne City. However, after an investigation by Australian Professional Leagues (APL), the scoreline was changed to 3–0 in favour of City due to insufficient U23 players in the Sydney FC squad whilst Ninković's goal still counted towards his goalscoring tally.

On 4 June, Sydney FC released a statement on contract discussions with Ninković following a video he posted on Instagram, saying he would leave the club after his contract expires. On 21 June, the club officially announced the departure of Ninković. Sydney FC Chief Executive Officer Adam Santo spoke about his departure saying:

"Milos is a legend of our club and we spent a number of weeks talking to him, in the hope he would continue to play a role in our future. We were optimistic he would accept our offer to continue playing and remain at the club long term, where he would transition into full time employment. It has always been our intention for Milos to finish his playing career with Sydney FC. Despite our best efforts, Milos has decided to move on and we thank him for the major contribution he has made to our club."

Following his departure, Steve Corica stated his desire to retain Ninković even after his request to play off the bench, but only if Ninković obtained Australian citizenship so he could bring in new foreign signings. Corica made it clear that Ninković was only released due to his refusal to pursue citizenship. Ninković denied these claims made by Corica in an interview with Code Sports, in which he opened up about the situation with him and Corica, saying that Corica demanded he takes up citizenship by the end preseason or "he had to retire" adding, "it will ruin his legacy". Ninković expressed his feeling of the situation, stating: "I felt disrespect, I felt really bad that my career will depend on if I get the citizenship or not. That means if I get the citizenship I can play if I don't get the citizenship I have to retire".

=== Western Sydney Wanderers ===
On 3 July 2022, Ninković had joined arch-rivals Western Sydney Wanderers on a one-year contract ahead of the upcoming season. The move was met with controversy, with British newspaper The Guardian described him "as a mercenary, who thrown away his connection with the Sky Blues' faithful, will likely permeate the fanbase", whilst his former teammate Alex Brosque said the transfer was a "slap in the face" to both clubs and criticised all those involved in a transfer, saying it should never have happened.

On 12 November 2022, Ninković made his first Sydney Derby appearance for the Wanderers, in which he was the subject of a pre-match tifo from The Cove criticising his decision to join the Wanderers; the tifo read 'Legends are cherishes. Traitors' Legacies will perish', along with depictions of club greats Steve Corica, Rhyan Grant and Alex Brosque as knights in shining armour, with Ninković's old No. 10 jersey being burned in the background. In the first Sydney Derby played at the reconstructed Sydney Football Stadium, and in front of a crowd of 34,232, the biggest Sydney Derby crowd since 2017, the Wanderers achieved their first Sydney Derby win at the Sydney Football Stadium in 3304 days, winning 1–0 through a Kusini Yengi goal in the 70th minute, with Ninković providing the assist.

On 6 May 2023, Ninković started in the 2–1 loss against Sydney FC in the Elimination final – the first time the two sides met in a Finals series. After the match, Ninković went into the Sydney FC dressing room to congratulate his former Sydney FC teammates and wished them good luck for their upcoming tie against Melbourne City. He soon was escorted out by two staff and exchanged words with Steve Corica who supposedly ejected him out of the dressing room. Marko Rudan addressed the situation, explaining that Corica "didn't appreciate him being in there," adding that the "bad blood" between the two might have been stemmed during a match where Corica said "something not very nice" to Ninković on the sideline. The situation received much response from players and reporters who said they found nothing wrong with it whilst many found Corica's reaction to being "child-like" and "over-reactive".

On 29 January 2024, Ninković announced his retirement at the end of the 2023–24 A-League Men season, aged 40, ending his career after 24 years in professional football.

== International career ==
Ninković made his maiden appearance for the Serbia national team in 2009 against Sweden.

He was a member of Serbia's 2010 FIFA World Cup squad. Having been benched in the match against Ghana, he was in Serbia's starting XI against Germany and Australia. He earned a total of 28 caps without goals.

== Personal life ==
Ninković became an Australian citizen in November 2022. He is married to Dejana, whom he met at a student party, and has three children, a son and two daughters, which his eldest daughter was born in Ukraine.

== Career statistics ==
=== Club ===
Appearances and goals by club, season and competition
Club	Season	League			National cup		Continental		Other		Total	
Club	Season	Division	Apps	Goals	Apps	Goals	Apps	Goals	Apps	Goals	Apps	Goals
Čukarički	2002–03	First League of Serbia and Montenegro	15	0	?	?	—		—		15	0
Čukarički	2003–04	Second League of Serbia and Montenegro	31	6	?	?	—		—		31	6
Čukarički	Total		46	6	?	?	—		—		46	6
Dynamo Kyiv	2004–05	Ukrainian Premier League	4	0	1	0	1	0	0	0	6	0
Dynamo Kyiv	2005–06	Ukrainian Premier League	3	0	2	0	0	0	0	0	5	0
Dynamo Kyiv	2006–07	Ukrainian Premier League	5	0	1	0	0	0	1	0	7	0
Dynamo Kyiv	2007–08	Ukrainian Premier League	17	2	5	0	3	0	1	0	26	2
Dynamo Kyiv	2008–09	Ukrainian Premier League	20	5	2	0	14	0	1	0	37	5
Dynamo Kyiv	2009–10	Ukrainian Premier League	26	4	1	0	6	0	0	0	33	4
Dynamo Kyiv	2010–11	Ukrainian Premier League	13	1	0	0	7	0	0	0	20	1
Dynamo Kyiv	2011–12	Ukrainian Premier League	16	1	0	0	6	1	0	0	22	2
Dynamo Kyiv	2012–13	Ukrainian Premier League	5	1	0	0	4	0	0	0	9	1
Dynamo Kyiv	Total		109	14	12	0	41	1	3	0	165	15
Évian (loan)	2012–13	Ligue 1	17	1	5	1	0	0	0	0	22	2
Red Star Belgrade	2013–14	Serbian SuperLiga	27	5	2	0	4	0	—		33	5
Évian	2014–15	Ligue 1	15	0	2	0	0	0	1	0	18	0
Sydney FC	2015–16	A-League	25	4	1	0	7	1	—		33	5
Sydney FC	2016–17	A-League	28	9	4	1	—		—		32	10
Sydney FC	2017–18	A-League	25	6	5	2	4	1	—		34	9
Sydney FC	2018–19	A-League	28	3	5	1	4	0	—		37	4
Sydney FC	2019–20	A-League	26	6	1	0	3	0	—		30	6
Sydney FC	2020–21	A-League	27	4	0	0	—		—		27	4
Sydney FC	2021–22	A-League	22	3	3	0	3	0	—		28	3
Sydney FC	Total		181	35	19	4	32	2	—		221	41
Western Sydney Wanderers	2022–23	A-League	21	0	3	1	—		—		24	1
Western Sydney Wanderers	2023–24	A-League	14	0	0	0	—		—		14	0
Western Sydney Wanderers	Total		35	0	3	1	—		—		38	1
Career total			430	61	43	6	66	3	4	0	543	70

=== International ===
Appearances and goals by national team and year
National team	Year	Apps	Goals
Serbia	2009	6	0
Serbia	2010	9	0
Serbia	2011	9	0
Serbia	2012	4	0
Total		28	0

== Honours ==
Dynamo Kyiv

- Ukrainian Premier League: 2006–07, 2008–09
- Ukrainian Cup: 2004–05, 2005–06, 2006–07
- Ukrainian Super Cup: 2006, 2007, 2009, 2011

Red Star

- Serbian SuperLiga: 2013–14

Sydney FC

- A-League Premiership: 2016–17, 2017–18, 2019–20
- A-League Championship: 2016–17, 2018–19, 2019–20
- FFA Cup: 2017

Individual

- Johnny Warren Medal: 2016–17, 2020–21
- PFA A-League Team of the Season: 2016–17, 2017–18, 2018–19, 2019–20, 2020–21
- Joe Marston Medal: 2019
- A-Leagues All Star: 2022
