= List of Melbourne City FC records and statistics =

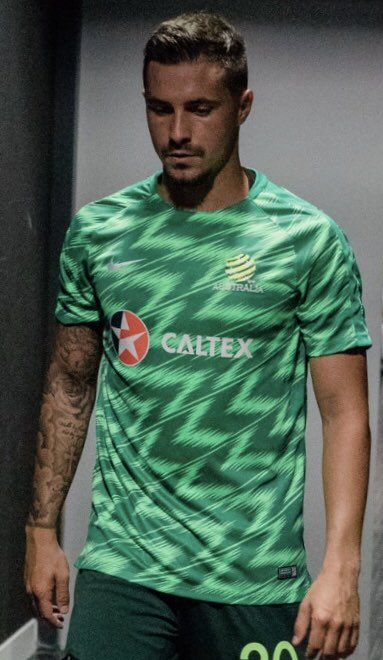
Jamie Maclaren became Melbourne City's record goalscorer in May 2021.

Melbourne City Football Club is an Australian professional soccer club based in Cranbourne East, Melbourne. The club was formed in 2009 as Melbourne Heart before being renamed as Melbourne City. They became the second Victorian member admitted into the A-League Men in 2010 after Melbourne Victory.

The list encompasses the honours won by Melbourne City. The player records section itemises the club's leading goalscorers and those who have made the most appearances in first-team competitions. It also records notable achievements by Melbourne City players on the international stage, and the highest transfer fees paid and received by the club.

Melbourne City has won three A-League Men premierships in 2020–21, 2021–22 and 2022–23, two A-League Men championships in 2021 and 2025, as well as an Australia Cup in 2016. The club's record appearance maker is Curtis Good, who has made 180 appearances, between 2011 and 2024. Jamie Maclaren is Melbourne City's record goalscorer, scoring 115 goals in total.

All figures are correct as of the match played on 6 December 2024.

== Honours and achievements ==
=== Domestic ===
- A-League Men Premiership

Winners (3): 2020–21, 2021–22, 2022–23
Runners-up (1): 2019–20

- A-League Men Championship

Winners (2): 2021, 2025
Runners-up (3): 2020, 2022, 2023

- Australia Cup

Winners (1): 2016
Runners-up (1): 2019

== Player records ==
=== Appearances ===
- Most A-League Men appearances: Curtis Good, 158
- Most Australia Cup appearances: Scott Jamieson, 15
- Most AFC Champions League appearances: Jamie Maclaren, 12
- Youngest first-team player: Idrus Abdulahi, 15 years, 216 days (against Central Coast Mariners, A-League, 26 April 2019)
- Oldest first-team player: Thomas Sørensen, 40 years, 285 days (against Western Sydney Wanderers, A-League, 24 March 2017)
- Most consecutive appearances: Bruno Fornaroli, 55 (from 26 August 2015 to 4 February 2017)

==== Most appearances ====
Competitive matches only, includes appearances as substitute. Numbers in brackets indicate goals scored.

#	Name	Years	A-League Men		Australia Cup	AFC Champions League	Total
#	Name	Years	Regular season	Finals series	Australia Cup	AFC Champions League	Total
1	(Australia) Curtis Good	2011–2012; 2018–2024	147 (6)	11 (1)	12 (1)	10 (0)	180 (8)
2	(Australia) Jamie Maclaren	2019–2024	132 (101)	10 (2)	10 (9)	12 (3)	164 (115)
3	(Australia) Scott Jamieson	2017–2023	130 (2)	10 (1)	15 (0)	6 (0)	161 (3)
4	(France) Florin Berenguer	2018–2023	97 (9)	10 (0)	8 (0)	0 (0)	115 (9)
5	(Australia) Aziz Behich	2010–2014; 2023–2024; 2024–	102 (2)	1 (0)	4 (0)	6 (1)	113 (3)
6	(Australia) Tom Glover	2019–2023	88 (0)	10 (0)	5 (0)	6 (0)	109 (0)
7	(Australia) Scott Galloway	2019–2024	85 (4)	7 (1)	9 (3)	5 (0)	106 (7)
8	(Australia) David Williams	2011–2016	99 (21)	2 (0)	2 (0)	0 (0)	103 (21)
9	(Australia) Andrew Nabbout	2020–	79 (12)	7 (0)	5 (1)	5 (2)	96 (15)
10	(Australia) Rostyn Griffiths	2018–2022	75 (4)	7 (0)	7 (0)	5 (0)	94 (4)
10	(Portugal) Nuno Reis	2021–2024	70 (1)	8 (0)	8 (0)	8 (0)	94 (1)
10	(Australia) Marco Tilio	2020–2023; 2024–	75 (16)	8 (3)	6 (0)	5 (3)	94 (22)

=== Goalscorers ===
- Most goals in a season: Jamie Maclaren, 29 goals (in the 2019–20 season)
- Most league goals in a season: Jamie Maclaren, 25 goals in the A-League, 2020–21
- Youngest goalscorer: Max Caputo, 17 years, 228 days (against Newcastle Jets, A-League Men, 2 April 2023)
- Oldest goalscorer: Tim Cahill, 37 years, 131 days (against Perth Glory, A-League, 16 April 2017)

==== Top goalscorers ====
Competitive matches only. Numbers in brackets indicate appearances made.

#	Name	Years	A-League Men		Australia Cup	AFC Champions League	Total
#	Name	Years	Regular season	Finals series	Australia Cup	AFC Champions League	Total
1	(Australia) Jamie Maclaren	2019–2024	101 (132)	2 (10)	9 (10)	3 (12)	115 (164)
2	(Uruguay) Bruno Fornaroli	2015–2019	46 (65)	2 (5)	9 (13)	0 (0)	57 (83)
3	(Australia) Aaron Mooy	2014–2016	18 (52)	0 (4)	6 (2)	0 (0)	24 (58)
4	(Australia) Marco Tilio	2020–2023; 2024–	16 (75)	3 (8)	0 (6)	3 (5)	22 (94)
5	(Australia) David Williams	2011–2016	21 (99)	0 (2)	0 (2)	0 (0)	21 (103)
6	(Germany) Tolgay Arslan	2023–2024	13 (23)	0 (1)	4 (4)	2 (6)	19 (34)
6	(Australia) Mathew Leckie	2021–	16 (53)	1 (7)	2 (6)	0 (3)	19 (69)
8	(Australia) Andrew Nabbout	2020–	12 (79)	0 (7)	1 (5)	2 (5)	15 (96)
8	(England) Craig Noone	2019–2021	11 (48)	0 (2)	4 (5)	0 (0)	15 (55)
10	(Scotland) Ross McCormack	2017–2018	14 (17)	0 (0)	0 (0)	0 (0)	14 (17)

=== International ===
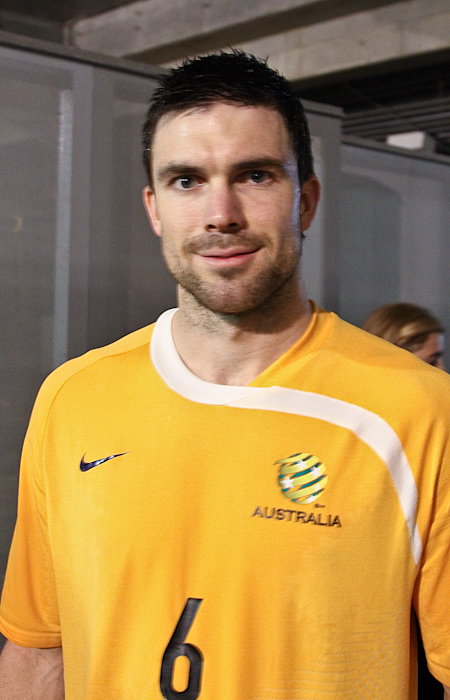
Michael Beauchamp was the first Melbourne City player to receive an international cap.

This section refers to caps won while a Melbourne City player.

- First capped player: Michael Beauchamp for Australia against New Zealand on 24 May 2010.
- Most capped player: Jamie Maclaren with 19 caps.
- First player to play in the World Cup finals: Daniel Arzani, for Australia against France on 16 June 2018

== Head coach records ==
- First full-time head coach: John van 't Schip managed Melbourne City from October 2009 to April 2012
- Longest-serving head coach: John van 't Schip, 3 years, 4 days (30 December 2013 to 3 January 2017)
- Shortest tenure as head coaches: Michael Valkanis, 5 months, 17 days (4 January 2017 to 19 June 2017)
- Highest win percentage: Patrick Kisnorbo, 58.11%
- Lowest win percentage: John Aloisi, 20.51%

== Club records ==
=== Matches ===
==== Firsts ====
- First match: Whittlesea Zebras 1–5 Melbourne Heart, friendly, 28 April 2010
- First A-League Men match: Melbourne Heart 0–1 Central Coast Mariners, 5 August 2010
- First A-League Men finals match: Perth Glory 3–0 Melbourne Heart, 1 April 2012
- First Australia Cup match: Melbourne City 1–3 Sydney FC, Round of 32, 12 August 2014
- First AFC Champions League match: BG Pathum United 1–1 Melbourne City, AFC Champions League group stage, 15 April 2022

==== Record wins ====
- Record A-League Men win: 8–0 against Perth Glory, 14 April 2024
- Record Australia Cup win: 5–0 against Heidelberg United, Quarter-final, 29 September 2015
- Record AFC Champions League win:
  - 3–0 against United City, Group stage, 18 April 2022
  - 3–0 against United City, Group stage, 1 May 2022

==== Record defeats ====
- Record A-League Men defeat: 0–6 against Adelaide United, 29 October 2023
- Record Australia Cup defeat: 0–4 against Adelaide United, Final, 23 October 2019
- Record AFC Champions League defeat: 0–1 against Buriram United, Group stage, 8 November 2023

==== Record consecutive results ====
- Record consecutive wins: 6, from 23 February 2021 to 26 March 2021
- Record consecutive defeats: 5
  - from 3 March 2013 to 30 March 2013
  - from 27 October 2013 to 24 November 2013
- Record consecutive matches without a defeat: 11, from 18 February 2022 to 6 April 2022
- Record consecutive matches without a win: 19, from 3 March 2013 to 10 January 2014
- Record consecutive matches without conceding a goal: 4, from 2 March 2021 to 22 March 2021
- Record consecutive matches without scoring a goal: 5, from 19 November 2010 to 8 December 2010

=== Goals ===
- Most league goals scored in a season: 63 in 27 matches, 2015–16
- Fewest league goals scored in a season: 31 in 27 matches, 2012–13
- Most league goals conceded in a season: 44 in 27 matches, 2015–16, 2016–17
- Fewest league goals conceded in a season: 32
  - in 27 matches, 2018–19
  - in 26 matches, 2020–21
  - in 26 matches, 2022–23

=== Points ===
- Most points in a season: 55 in 26 matches, 2022–23
- Fewest points in a season: 26 in 27 matches, 2013–14

=== Attendances ===
- Highest attendance at AAMI Park, 26,579 against Melbourne Victory, A-League, 23 December 2011
- Highest non-derby attendance at AAMI Park, 22,495 against Western United, A-League Grand Final, 28 May 2022
- Lowest attendance at AAMI Park, 1,800 against Western Sydney Wanderers, FFA Cup quarter-finals, 19 September 2018
- Lowest attendance, 1,153 against Wellington Phoenix, Jack Edwards Reserve, Australia Cup, 27 August 2023

== See also ==
- List of Melbourne City FC seasons
