= A-League transfers for 2018–19 season =

This is a list of Australian soccer transfers for the 2018–19 A-League. Only moves featuring at least one A-League club are listed.

Clubs were able to sign players at any time, but many transfers will only officially go through on 1 June because the majority of player contracts finish on 31 May.

== Transfers ==
All players without a flag are Australian. Clubs without a flag are clubs participating in the A-League.

=== Pre-season ===
Date	Name	Moving from	Moving to
6 April 2018	Joshua Rose	Central Coast Mariners	Retired
17 April 2018	(Italy) Marco Rossi	Wellington Phoenix	Unattached
18 April 2018	Josh Bingham	Central Coast Mariners	Unattached
18 April 2018	Tom Glover	Central Coast Mariners	(England) Tottenham Hotspur (end of loan)
18 April 2018	Jacob Poscoliero	Central Coast Mariners	Unattached
18 April 2018	Blake Powell	Central Coast Mariners	Unattached
18 April 2018	Liam Rose	Central Coast Mariners	Unattached
18 April 2018	Peter Skapetis	Central Coast Mariners	Unattached
19 April 2018	(Spain) Andreu	Perth Glory	Unattached
19 April 2018	(England) Joseph Mills	Perth Glory	Unattached
19 April 2018	Jeremy Walker	Perth Glory	Unattached
20 April 2018	(Tunisia) Fahid Ben Khalfallah	Brisbane Roar	Retired
24 April 2018	(Italy) Massimo Maccarone	Brisbane Roar	Unattached
26 April 2018	Jade North	Brisbane Roar	Unattached
27 April 2018	(Spain) Álvaro Cejudo	Western Sydney Wanderers	Unattached
27 April 2018	Michael Thwaite	Western Sydney Wanderers	Unattached
30 April 2018	Adam Taggart	Perth Glory	Brisbane Roar
3 May 2018	Christian Cavallo	Melbourne City	Unattached
3 May 2018	Nick Fitzgerald	Melbourne City	Western Sydney Wanderers
3 May 2018	Bruce Kamau	Melbourne City	Western Sydney Wanderers
3 May 2018	(Malta) Manny Muscat	Melbourne City	Unattached
3 May 2018	Ruon Tongyik	Melbourne City	Western Sydney Wanderers
3 May 2018	Mitchell Oxborrow	Brisbane Roar	Unattached
4 May 2018	Dylan Wenzel-Halls	(Australia) Western Pride	Brisbane Roar
4 May 2018	(New Zealand) Keegan Smith	Wellington Phoenix	(New Zealand) Lower Hutt City
7 May 2018	Jack Clisby	Western Sydney Wanderers	Central Coast Mariners
8 May 2018	Corey Gameiro	Brisbane Roar	Central Coast Mariners
9 May 2018	Tarek Elrich	Adelaide United	Western Sydney Wanderers
9 May 2018	(Netherlands) Jordy Buijs	Sydney FC	Unattached
9 May 2018	Luke Wilkshire	Sydney FC	Unattached
9 May 2018	(New Zealand) Matthew Ridenton	Wellington Phoenix	Newcastle Jets
10 May 2018	Trent Buhagiar	Central Coast Mariners	Sydney FC
10 May 2018	Matt Simon	Sydney FC	Central Coast Mariners
14 May 2018	Jonathan Aspropotamitis	Western Sydney Wanderers	Central Coast Mariners
14 May 2018	(Denmark) Michael Jakobsen	Melbourne City	Adelaide United
15 May 2018	Cameron McGilp	Melbourne Victory	Unattached
15 May 2018	(Argentina) Matías Sánchez	Melbourne Victory	Unattached
16 May 2018	(Argentina) Patito Rodríguez	Newcastle Jets	Unattached
19 May 2018	Christian Theoharous	Melbourne Victory	(Germany) Borussia Mönchengladbach
23 May 2018	(Denmark) Johan Absalonsen	Adelaide United	(Denmark) SønderjyskE
24 May 2018	Ben Garuccio	Adelaide United	(Scotland) Heart of Midlothian
25 May 2018	(Germany) Daniel Adlung	Adelaide United	Unattached
25 May 2018	(Slovenia) Džengis Čavušević	Adelaide United	Unattached
25 May 2018	Mark Ochieng	Adelaide United	Unattached
25 May 2018	Craig Goodwin	Unattached	Adelaide United
28 May 2018	Stefan Mauk	Melbourne City	Brisbane Roar
31 May 2018	Ivan Franjic	Brisbane Roar	Perth Glory
31 May 2018	(Turkey) Ersan Gülüm	Adelaide United	Hebei China Fortune (end of loan)
1 June 2018	(Netherlands) Wout Brama	Central Coast Mariners	(Netherlands) Twente
1 June 2018	(Serbia) Matija Ljujić	Wellington Phoenix	(Portugal) Belenenses
5 June 2018	(Spain) Alan Baró	Central Coast Mariners	Unattached
5 June 2018	(Denmark) Tobias Mikkelsen	(Denmark) Nordsjælland	Brisbane Roar
6 June 2018	David Carney	Sydney FC	Unattached
6 June 2018	Anthony Kalik	Sydney FC	(Croatia) Hajduk Split (end of loan)
6 June 2018	Jordan O'Doherty	Adelaide United	Western Sydney Wanderers
7 June 2018	Mario Shabow	Newcastle Jets	Central Coast Mariners
13 June 2018	(Serbia) Andrija Kaluđerović	Wellington Phoenix	Unattached
13 June 2018	(Croatia) Goran Paracki	Wellington Phoenix	Unattached
14 June 2018	Tomislav Mrcela	Unattached	Perth Glory
17 June 2018	(Scotland) Michael O'Halloran	(Scotland) Rangers	Melbourne City
19 June 2018	Brendon Santalab	Western Sydney Wanderers	Perth Glory
19 June 2018	Joe Gauci	(Australia) West Torrens Birkalla	Central Coast Mariners
19 June 2018	James Donachie	Melbourne Victory	(South Korea) Jeonnam Dragons
19 June 2018	Pierce Waring	Melbourne Victory	Unattached
19 June 2018	(Poland) Marcin Budziński	Melbourne City	Unattached
20 June 2018	Riley McGree	Newcastle Jets	Melbourne City
20 June 2018	Oliver Bozanic	Melbourne City	(Scotland) Heart of Midlothian
22 June 2018	Matthew Spiranovic	Unattached	Perth Glory
22 June 2018	Corey Brown	Brisbane Roar	Melbourne Victory
22 June 2018	(New Zealand) Storm Roux	Central Coast Mariners	Melbourne Victory
25 June 2018	Anthony Cáceres	(England) Manchester City	Melbourne City (loan)
25 June 2018	Lachlan Wales	Central Coast Mariners	Melbourne City
26 June 2018	Denis Genreau	Melbourne City	(Netherlands) PEC Zwolle (loan)
26 June 2018	(New Zealand) Michael McGlinchey	Wellington Phoenix	Central Coast Mariners
28 June 2018	(Mali) Kalifa Cissé	Unattached	Central Coast Mariners
29 June 2018	(Kosovo) Besart Berisha	Melbourne Victory	(Japan) Sanfrecce Hiroshima
30 June 2018	Chris Ikonomidis	Western Sydney Wanderers	(Italy) Lazio (end of loan)
30 June 2018	Steven Lustica	Western Sydney Wanderers	Unattached
2 July 2018	Tando Velaphi	Wellington Phoenix	Perth Glory
4 July 2018	Danijel Nizic	Unattached	Western Sydney Wanderers
5 July 2018	(Poland) Adrian Mierzejewski	Sydney FC	(China) Changchun Yatai
6 July 2018	(Denmark) Ken Ilsø	Unattached	Adelaide United
7 July 2018	(Brazil) Bobô	Sydney FC	(Turkey) Alanyaspor
9 July 2018	Matthew Millar	(Australia) South Melbourne	Central Coast Mariners
10 July 2018	(England) Steven Taylor	Unattached	Wellington Phoenix
10 July 2018	(Portugal) Fabio Ferreira	Sydney FC	Perth Glory
11 July 2018	(New Zealand) James McGarry	Wellington Phoenix	(Netherlands) Willem II
12 July 2018	Rhys Williams	Melbourne Victory	(Saudi Arabia) Al-Qadsiah
12 July 2018	(Netherlands) Leroy George	Melbourne Victory	Unattached
13 July 2018	Jason Davidson	(Croatia) Rijeka	Perth Glory
18 July 2018	(New Zealand) Logan Rogerson	Wellington Phoenix	(Germany) Carl Zeiss Jena
18 July 2018	(Poland) Filip Kurto	(Netherlands) Roda JC	Wellington Phoenix
18 July 2018	Lewis Italiano	Wellington Phoenix	(Australia) Stirling Lions
19 July 2018	Rostyn Griffiths	Unattached	Melbourne City
19 July 2018	Stefan Nigro	Melbourne Victory	Brisbane Roar
19 July 2018	(Germany) Georg Niedermeier	(Germany) SC Freiburg	Melbourne Victory
19 July 2018	(Spain) Juande	(Italy) Spezia	Perth Glory
20 July 2018	Adam Parkhouse	Wellington Phoenix	Unattached
20 July 2018	Nick Ansell	Unattached	Melbourne Victory
21 July 2018	(Germany) Mirko Boland	(Germany) Eintracht Braunschweig	Adelaide United
23 July 2018	David Williams	Unattached	Wellington Phoenix
23 July 2018	Mitch Nichols	Unattached	Wellington Phoenix
24 July 2018	(England) Wayne Brown	Newcastle Jets	Unattached
25 July 2018	Daniel De Silva	Central Coast Mariners	Sydney FC (loan)
25 July 2018	(Germany) Patrick Ziegler	(Germany) 1. FC Kaiserslautern	Western Sydney Wanderers
25 July 2018	(Poland) Michał Kopczyński	(Poland) Legia Warsaw	Wellington Phoenix (loan)
26 July 2018	Joe Knowles	Perth Glory	Unattached
27 July 2018	(Netherlands) Jop van der Linden	(Netherlands) AZ Alkmaar	Sydney FC
31 July 2018	Jack Duncan	Newcastle Jets	(Saudi Arabia) Al-Qadsiah
31 July 2018	(Japan) Keisuke Honda	Unattached	Melbourne Victory
31 July 2018	(Spain) Xavi Torres	Perth Glory	(Spain) Elche
1 August 2018	Scott Galloway	Wellington Phoenix	Adelaide United
6 August 2018	Josh Macdonald	(Australia) Wollongong Wolves	Central Coast Mariners
6 August 2018	Jordan Murray	(Australia) APIA Leichhardt Tigers	Central Coast Mariners
9 August 2018	(Germany) Alexander Baumjohann	(Brazil) Club Vitória	Western Sydney Wanderers
9 August 2018	Daniel Arzani	Melbourne City	(England) Manchester City
15 August 2018	Ben Halloran	Unattached	Adelaide United
15 August 2018	Aiden O'Neill	(England) Burnley	Central Coast Mariners (loan)
17 August 2018	(England) Adam Le Fondre	(England) Bolton Wanderers	Sydney FC
23 August 2018	(Netherlands) Siem de Jong	(Netherlands) Ajax	Sydney FC (loan)
23 August 2018	Riley Warland	Perth Glory	(England) Fulham
30 August 2018	(France) Florin Berenguer	(France) Sochaux	Melbourne City
30 August 2018	Mitch Austin	Melbourne Victory	Newcastle Jets
31 August 2018	(Sweden) Ola Toivonen	Unattached	Melbourne Victory
31 August 2018	Dean Bouzanis	Melbourne City	(Netherlands) PEC Zwolle (loan)
3 September 2018	(Spain) Raúl Baena	(Spain) Granada	Melbourne Victory (loan)
10 September 2018	(Brazil) Jair	Unattached	Newcastle Jets
11 September 2018	Mark Birighitti	Unattached	Melbourne City
11 September 2018	Chris Ikonomidis	(Italy) Lazio	Perth Glory
14 September 2018	(Belgium) Ritchie De Laet	(England) Aston Villa	Melbourne City (loan)
18 September 2018	Curtis Good	Unattached	Melbourne City
19 September 2018	(England) Kaine Sheppard	(Australia) Avondale	Newcastle Jets
20 September 2018	(Scotland) Ross McCormack	(England) Aston Villa	Central Coast Mariners (loan)
20 September 2018	Tommy Oar	Unattached	Central Coast Mariners
26 September 2018	Lewis Italiano	(Australia) Stirling Lions	Newcastle Jets
28 September 2018	(Spain) Álex López	Unattached	Brisbane Roar
4 October 2018	Rashid Mahazi	(Australia) Moreland Zebras	Western Sydney Wanderers
11 October 2018	Max Burgess	(Australia) Sydney Olympic	Wellington Phoenix
12 October 2018	(Spain) Mandi	Unattached	Wellington Phoenix
12 October 2018	Kearyn Baccus	Western Sydney Wanderers	Melbourne City
17 October 2018	Reuben Way	(Australia) Heidelberg United	Wellington Phoenix
17 October 2018	(New Zealand) Callan Elliot	(New Zealand) Tasman United	Wellington Phoenix
19 October 2018	Rahmat Akbari	Brisbane Roar	Melbourne Victory (loan)

=== Mid-season ===
Date	Name	Moving from	Moving to
9 November 2018	Jacob Tratt	(Australia) Sutherland Sharks	Sydney FC
6 December 2018	Ante Covic	Unattached	Wellington Phoenix
13 December 2018	Ante Covic	Wellington Phoenix	Unattached
31 December 2018	Kwame Yeboah	Unattached	Western Sydney Wanderers
2 January 2019	Anthony Cáceres	Melbourne City	Sydney FC
2 January 2019	(Republic of Ireland) Cillian Sheridan	Unattached	Wellington Phoenix
3 January 2019	Elvis Kamsoba	(Australia) Avondale	Melbourne Victory
3 January 2019	Anthony Lesiotis	Melbourne City	Melbourne Victory
5 January 2019	(Scotland) Ross McCormack	Central Coast Mariners	(England) Aston Villa (end of loan)
7 January 2019	(Scotland) Michael O'Halloran	Melbourne City	Unattached
9 January 2019	Taylor Regan	Adelaide United	(Malaysia) Selangor
15 January 2019	Mitch Nichols	Wellington Phoenix	Unattached
15 January 2019	Reuben Way	Wellington Phoenix	Unattached
23 January 2019	Nicholas Sette	Melbourne Victory	Unattached
24 January 2019	Osama Malik	Melbourne City	(Saudi Arabia) Al-Batin
24 January 2019	(Turkey) Jem Karacan	Unattached	Central Coast Mariners
25 January 2019	Mitchell Duke	Unattached	Western Sydney Wanderers
28 January 2019	(Greece) Avraam Papadopoulos	Brisbane Roar	(Greece) Olympiacos
29 January 2019	(New Zealand) Justin Gulley	(New Zealand) Team Wellington	Wellington Phoenix
29 January 2019	(Iran) Reza Ghoochannejhad	(Cyprus) APOEL FC	Sydney FC (loan)
30 January 2019	Antony Golec	Central Coast Mariners	Wellington Phoenix
30 January 2019	(Mali) Kalifa Cissé	Central Coast Mariners	Retired
31 January 2019	Mitch Austin	Newcastle Jets	Sydney FC
31 January 2019	(Netherlands) Jordy Thomassen	(Netherlands) De Graafschap	Adelaide United (loan)
31 January 2019	(England) Sam Graham	(England) Sheffield United	Central Coast Mariners (loan)
31 January 2019	(Republic of Ireland) Stephen Mallon	(England) Sheffield United	Central Coast Mariners (loan)
31 January 2019	James Donachie	(South Korea) Jeonnam Dragons	Melbourne Victory (loan)
31 January 2019	Nick Ansell	Melbourne Victory	(South Korea) Jeonnam Dragons
31 January 2019	Jamie Maclaren	(Germany) SV Darmstadt 98	Melbourne City
1 February 2019	Adam Berry	Central Coast Mariners	Unattached
1 February 2019	(England) Shayon Harrison	(England) Tottenham Hotspur	Melbourne City (loan)
6 February 2019	Charles Lokolingoy	Sydney FC	Brisbane Roar
6 February 2019	Ruon Tongyik	Western Sydney Wanderers	Brisbane Roar
14 February 2019	Adam Taggart	Brisbane Roar	(South Korea) Suwon Samsung Bluewings
22 February 2019	Lachlan Scott	Western Sydney Wanderers	(Australia) Wollongong Wolves
26 February 2019	(Uruguay) Bruno Fornaroli	Melbourne City	Unattached
1 March 2019	Jake McGing	Central Coast Mariners	(Poland) Wisła Płock
5 March 2019	Giancarlo Gallifuoco	Unattached	Western Sydney Wanderers
6 March 2019	Eli Babalj	Unattached	Brisbane Roar
9 March 2019	Kwabena Appiah	Unattached	Newcastle Jets
13 March 2019	Dylan Fox	Wellington Phoenix	Unattached
13 March 2019	Shannon Brady	Brisbane Roar	(Australia) Gold Coast Knights
15 March 2019	Josh Macdonald	Central Coast Mariners	Unattached

Player was released to free agency before joining new club
Mauk returned from loan to his parent club N.E.C. before joining Brisbane Roar
McGree returned from loan to his parent club Club Brugge before being loaned to Melbourne City
Cáceres returned from loan to his parent club Manchester City before being loaned to Sydney FC
