= 2018–19 Melbourne City FC season =

Melbourne City
2018–19 season
- Owner: City Football Group
- Chairman: Khaldoon Al Mubarak
- Manager: Warren Joyce
- Stadium: AAMI Park
- A-League: 5th
- A-League Finals: Elimination-finals
- FFA Cup: Quarter-finals
- Top goalscorer: League: Ritchie De Laet; Riley McGree (7 each); All: Riley McGree (8)
- Highest home attendance: 24,306 vs. Melbourne Victory (22 December 2018); A-League
- Lowest home attendance: 1,800 vs. Western Sydney Wanderers (19 September 2018); FFA Cup
- Average home league attendance: 8,382
- Biggest win: 5–0 vs. Central Coast Mariners (H) (26 April 2019); A-League
- Biggest defeat: 0–3 vs. Sydney FC (H) (2 November 2018); A-League; 0–3 vs. Western Sydney Wanderers (A) (30 March 2019); A-League
Home colours	Away colours	Third colours

The 2018–19 season was the ninth in the history of Melbourne City Football Club. In addition to the domestic league, Melbourne City competed in the FFA Cup for the fifth time.

== Players ==
=== Squad information ===
Note: Flags indicate national team as defined under FIFA eligibility rules; some limited exceptions apply. Players may hold more than one non-FIFA nationality.

No.	Pos.	Nation	Player
1	GK	AUS	Mark Birighitti
2	DF	BEL	Ritchie De Laet (on loan from Aston Villa)
3	DF	AUS	Scott Jamieson
4	DF	AUS	Harrison Delbridge
5	DF	NED	Bart Schenkeveld
7	MF	AUS	Rostyn Griffiths
8	MF	AUS	Riley McGree (on loan from Club Brugge)
9	FW	ENG	Shayon Harrison (on loan from Tottenham Hotspur)
10	MF	AUS	Dario Vidošić
13	MF	AUS	Nathaniel Atkinson
15	MF	AUS	Kearyn Baccus

No.	Pos.	Nation	Player
18	GK	AUS	Eugene Galekovic
19	MF	AUS	Lachlan Wales
21	MF	AUS	Ramy Najjarine (Scholarship)
22	DF	AUS	Curtis Good
25	DF	ITA	Iacopo La Rocca
26	MF	AUS	Luke Brattan (on loan from Manchester City)
27	MF	FRA	Florin Berenguer
29	FW	AUS	Jamie Maclaren
30	MF	AUS	Moudi Najjar (scholarship)
34	DF	AUS	Connor Metcalfe (scholarship)
42	GK	AUS	James Delianov

== Review ==
=== Pre-season ===
Melbourne City began their pre-season by playing two games in Kochi, India beating Indian club Kerala Blasters 6–0 and losing to Spanish club Girona FC 6–0. During August-October, the club played a training match each month, drawing with Adelaide United at Coopers Stadium and beating Adelaide United and Perth Glory at City Football Academy. On 12 October, Melbourne City played Western Sydney Wanderers in a friendly for the second season in a row at McEwen Reserve which ended in a 4–1 victory.

=== May ===
The club released five players on 3 May. Nick Fitzgerald, Bruce Kamau, and Ruon Tongyik were released to the Western Sydney Wanderers, while Christian Cavallo and Manny Muscat later joined Green Gully. Later in the month, Danish midfielder Michael Jakobsen left to join Adelaide United and Australian midfielder Stefan Mauk joined Brisbane Roar via return to his parent club N.E.C. in the Netherlands.

=== June ===
City signed four players in nine days with Anthony Cáceres signing a one-year loan from Manchester City once more. Scottish player Michael O'Halloran joined City on a two-year contract from Rangers. Riley McGree signed a one-year deal from Belgian club, Club Brugge. Lastly, former Central Coast Mariners man, Lachlan Wales also signed a one-year deal.

Melbourne City's marquee man, Marcin Budziński mutual terminated his contract, while Oliver Bozanic joined Scottish club Heart of Midlothian at the conclusion of his Melbourne City contract. Finally, City teenager, Denis Genreau was loaned to PEC Zwolle for a season.

=== July ===
For the second season in a row, Luke Brattan's loan was extended by another additional year on 5 July. On 19 July, Melbourne City signed Australian midfielder Rostyn Griffiths, following his time at Uzbek club Pakhtakor Tashkent.

=== August ===
On 7 August, Melbourne City played their first FFA Cup game against Brisbane Roar with Luke Brattan suffering a big injury blow. His injury was on for a long time from the 36th minute. It was already past half-time, but referee kept the time of the game go on. When the full 90 minutes were up, the second half was restarted with the game almost being the longest FFA Cup match. It was still goalless then, so extra time came. In the 120th minute, Bruno Fornaroli's big strike in the top-left corner sent Melbourne City 1–0 clear to move to the Round of 16.

On 29 August, Bruno Fornaroli was again the hero for Melbourne City, scoring a goal outside the box hitting the top-right hand side of the net, giving Melbourne City a 1–0 win against Newcastle Jets sending them to the quarter-finals.

On 9 August, City's promising young talent, Daniel Arzani joined Manchester City, with the expectation to be immediately loaned out to Celtic. On 30 August, Melbourne City signed French attacking midfielder Florin Berenguer from Sochaux as a visa player. Melbourne City then made their second loan to PEC Zwolle, with goalkeeper Dean Bouzanis joining Denis Genreau on loan for the season.

=== September ===
Three new players signed for Melbourne City in mid-September. After three years in Europe, Mark Birighitti signed a three-year deal to return to the A-League and replace Bouzanis who was loaned-out, Ritchie De Laet signed on a one-year loan from Aston Villa and was designated as a marquee player, and defender Curtis Good, who played for the club in 2012, returned on a one-year deal.

On 19 September, Melbourne City played in their quarter-finals for the FFA Cup against Western Sydney Wanderers at AAMI Park. City lost 2–1 loss, with Riley McGree scoring his first goal for the club, and were knocked-out of the cup.

=== October ===
The former Western Sydney Wanderers midfielder, Kearyn Baccus signed for Melbourne City as an injury replacement for Michael O'Halloran who suffered a hamstring injury.

On 20 October, City played their first game of the season which ended in a 2–1 victory over their derby rivals, Melbourne Victory, placing them at the top of the table at the end of the round along with Wellington Phoenix. Ritchie De Laet and Riley McGree scored City's goals.

=== November ===
The month of November didn't turn out well for Melbourne City. On 2 November, City again couldn't find a victory against Sydney FC still when City's last win against Sydney FC was a 1–0 victory in the 2016 FFA Cup Final. They were redeeming themselves after a 2–0 win against Wellington Phoenix on 9 November. On 24 November, City were again struggling to try and mostly win at Suncorp Stadium, Brisbane after a 2–0 defeat from Brisbane Roar.

=== December ===
Melbourne City played their first game against Newcastle Jets for the season which ended in a 3–0 win, with Riley McGree scoring with only two minutes played, along with Luke Brattan who scored a long volley from outside the box to double City's advantage in stoppage time, as then the speedster, Lachlan Wales scored his first goal for City with a long run to tap the ball home through the legs of Glen Moss.

On the 8th, City's was facing the top of the table's team, Perth Glory. It ended in a disappointing 1–0 loss with the only goal coming from Chris Ikonomidis. Curtis Good with 10 minutes to go, had also been sent off with a second yellow card.

Melbourne City redeemed themselves again with a 2–0 win over Adelaide United with Jordan Elsey scoring an own goal from a crossing ball from Ramy Najjarine. Luke Brattan finished it off with a bullet into the bottom left corner, with Paul Izzo getting a hand to the ball, but couldn't keep it out. The celebration had Brattan using the corner flag as a golf club as he looked like he was playing golf.

The final game for City in December, was the second Melbourne Derby of the season which Victory wanted to win for a seventh straight win of the season. The Swedish World Cup international striker, Ola Toivonen tapped the opening goal for Victory. City in stoppage time scored the equalizer with Dario Vidošić directing the header into back of the net. It resulted into a 1–1 draw.

=== January ===
January was a start that the Melburnians were dreaming for. Melbourne City faced the Western Sydney Wanderers on New Year's Day, with a 2–0 win over them. Two goals were in quick succession for City with Lachlan Wales and Ritchie De Laet both scoring in 3 minutes.

On the 2nd, Anthony Cáceres loan ended leaving City to Manchester City as he also signed for Sydney FC in the transfer on another one-year loan. The next day the youngster, Anthony Lesiotis was released to Melbourne Victory.

With the two Anthony's gone, City again was playing against Newcastle Jets at home result was a 2–1 win for City with Riley McGree and Luke Brattan again scoring the two first two goals when facing Newcastle.

On the 8th, Michael O'Halloran left City in a mutual-contract termination leaving City with only two forwards in their squad, being left with Bruno Fornaroli and Gianluca Iannucci.

Three days later, Melbourne City then faced Brisbane Roar at AAMI Park which ended in a 1–0 win with Ritchie De Laet scoring his fifth goal of the season.

On a Wednesday night in Gosford, Central Coast Mariners was hosting City for the second and last time for the season. The result was a heartbreaking 2–1 loss for City over bottom-of-the-table Mariners. The second goal for the Mariners, was from Matt Simon as Galekovic saved a penalty from Simon with the ball rebounding back to him and scoring on the other side of the net in the 89th minute which handed the Mariners their first win of the season.

On the 19th, City was facing the top-of-the table side, Perth Glory at home. Many chances came on for both teams, and eventually ended in a goalless game (0–0).

On the 22nd, City played the Western Sydney Wanderers and had one of AAMI Park's highest-scoring games with the game ending in a 4–3 win for Melbourne City. Bart Schenkeveld was the hero and won the game for City in stoppage time.

=== February ===
With no star-man, up front including the marquee man Bruno Fornaroli; Jamie Maclaren and Shayon Harrison had signed for City in the opening two days of February. Maclaren was a signing for four years, which is almost the exact same time, Bruno Fornaroli had been into the club. Shayon Harrison (on loan from Tottenham Hotspur) signed on a one-year loan.

On 3 March, Melbourne City travelled to Jubilee Oval to face Sydney FC with no Maclaren or Harrison within their starting lineup. The game then resulted into a 2–0 loss.

Jamie Maclaren and Shayon Harrison had returned to their match-day squad for a home clash against Adelaide United (9 February) with both of them in the Starting XI up front. Maclaren had opened his account with his first goal for Melbourne City and then ended in a 1–1 draw.

On the 15th, played for the third and final time against Newcastle Jets which this time ended in a 3–1 loss with again Jamie Maclaren scoring the goal for City which was now two-in-two, for the Melbourne number 29.

Bruno Fornaroli had finally called his time to depart Melbourne City on the 26th.

== Transfers ==
=== Transfers in ===
No.	Position	Player	Transferred from	Type/fee	Contract length	Date	Ref
11	FW	(Scotland) Michael O'Halloran	(Scotland) Rangers	Free transfer	2 years	17 June 2018	
8	MF	Riley McGree	(Belgium) Club Brugge	Loan	1 year	20 June 2018	
17	MF	Anthony Cáceres	(England) Manchester City	Loan	1 year	25 June 2018	
19	MF	Lachlan Wales	Central Coast Mariners	Free transfer	1 year	25 June 2018	
7	MF	Rostyn Griffiths		Free transfer	2 years	19 July 2018	
27	MF	(France) Florin Berenguer	(France) Sochaux	Free transfer	1 year	30 August 2018	
1	GK	Mark Birighitti		Free transfer	3 years	11 September 2018	
2	DF	(Belgium) Ritchie De Laet	(England) Aston Villa	Loan	1 year	14 September 2018	
22	DF	Curtis Good		Undisclosed Fee	1 year	18 September 2018	
15	MF	Kearyn Baccus	Western Sydney Wanderers	Injury replacement		12 October 2018	
29	FW	Jamie Maclaren	(Germany) SV Darmstadt 98	$171,000	4 years	1 February 2019	
9	FW	(England) Shayon Harrison	(England) Tottenham Hotspur	Loan	1 year	2 February 2019	

=== Transfers out ===
No.	Position	Player	Transferred to	Type/fee	Date	Ref
2	DF	(Malta) Manny Muscat		Released	3 May 2018	
7	FW	Nick Fitzgerald	Western Sydney Wanderers	Released	3 May 2018	
11	FW	Bruce Kamau	Western Sydney Wanderers	Released	3 May 2018	
19	DF	Christian Cavallo		Released	3 May 2018	
21	DF	Ruon Tongyik	Western Sydney Wanderers	Released	3 May 2018	
22	DF	(Denmark) Michael Jakobsen	Adelaide United	Free transfer	14 May 2018	
13	MF	Stefan Mauk	(Netherlands) N.E.C.	Loan return	28 May 2018	
27	MF	(Poland) Marcin Budziński		Mutual contract termination	19 June 2018	
8	MF	Oliver Bozanic	(Scotland) Heart of Midlothian	End of contract	20 June 2018	
15	MF	Denis Genreau	(Netherlands) PEC Zwolle	Loan	26 June 2018	
14	MF	Daniel Arzani	(England) Manchester City	$1,000,000	9 August 2018	
1	GK	Dean Bouzanis	(Netherlands) PEC Zwolle	Loan	31 August 2018	
17	MF	Anthony Cáceres	(England) Manchester City	Loan return	2 January 2019	
39	MF	Anthony Lesiotis	Melbourne Victory	Released	3 January 2019	
11	FW	(Scotland) Michael O'Halloran		Mutual contract termination	8 January 2019	
6	MF	Osama Malik	(Saudi Arabia) Al-Batin	Free transfer	24 January 2019	
23	FW	(Uruguay) Bruno Fornaroli		Mutual contract termination	26 February 2019	

=== Contract extensions ===
No.	Name	Position	Duration	Date	Notes
6	Osama Malik	Centre-back	1 year	25 June 2018	
26	Luke Brattan	Central midfielder	1 year	5 July 2018	(Note: Brattan's loan from Manchester City was extended an additional year from 5 July 2018.)
15	Kearyn Baccus	Central midfielder	3 years	8 January 2019	(Note: Baccus was signed as an injury replacement player at the start of the season, before signing a 3 1/2-year deal with the club in January 2019.)

== Technical staff ==
Position	Name
Head coach	(England) Warren Joyce
Assistant coach	(Australia) Tony Vidmar
Goalkeeping coach	(Australia) Zeljko Kalac
Head of Sport Science	(England) Edward Leng
Club physio	(Australia) Belinda Pacella
Youth team manager	(Australia) Joe Palatsides
Youth Team Assistant	(Australia) Patrick Kisnorbo

== Pre-season and friendlies ==
=== Friendlies ===
Win Draw Loss

21 August 2018	Adelaide United	0–0	Melbourne City	Adelaide
		Report		Stadium: Coopers Stadium; Attendance: 0 (behind closed doors)

12 September 2018	Melbourne City	2–0	Adelaide United	Melbourne
	Wales 12'; Vidošić 16'	Report		Stadium: City Football Academy; Attendance: 0 (behind closed doors)

25 September 2018	Melbourne City	1–1	Brisbane Roar	Melbourne
	Vidošić 55' (pen.)	Report	Henrique 6'	Stadium: City Football Academy; Attendance: 0 (behind closed doors)

7 October 2018	Melbourne City	1–0	Perth Glory	Melbourne
	Vidošić 17'	Report		Stadium: City Football Academy; Attendance: 0 (behind closed doors)

12 October 2018	Melbourne City	4–1	Western Sydney Wanderers	Shepparton
19:30 AEDT	Delbridge 21'; Berenguer 24'; Vidošić 67'; McGree 90+1'	Report	Majok 42'	Stadium: McEwen Reserve; Referee: Shaun Evans

=== Toyota Yaris LaLiga World ===
24 July 2018	Kerala Blasters (India)	0–6	Melbourne City	Kochi, India
19:00 IST		Report	Vidošić 30'; McGree 33', 56'; Wales 50'; Najjarine 75'; Fornaroli 79'	Stadium: Jawaharlal Nehru International Stadium

27 July 2018	Girona FC (Spain)	6–0	Melbourne City	Kochi, India
19:00 IST	Portu 10', 16'; Lozano 24'; Juanpe 51'; Andzouana 68'; Porro 90'	Report		Stadium: Jawaharlal Nehru International Stadium

== Competitions ==
=== Overall record ===
Competition	First match	Last match	Starting round	Final position	Record							
Competition	First match	Last match	Starting round	Final position	Pld	W	D	L	GF	GA	GD	Win %
A-League	20 October 2018	26 April 2019	Matchday 1	5th	27	11	7	9	39	32	+7	40.74
A-League Finals	5 May 2019		Elimination-finals	Elimination-finals	1	0	0	1	0	1	−1	0.00
FFA Cup	7 August 2018	19 September 2018	Round of 32	Quarter-finals	3	2	0	1	3	2	+1	66.67
Total					31	13	7	11	42	35	+7	41.94

Last updated: complete
Source: Soccerway

=== A-League ===
==== League table ====
Pos	Team	Pld	W	D	L	GF	GA	GD	Pts	Qualification
1	Perth Glory	27	18	6	3	56	23	+33	60	Qualification for 2020 AFC Champions League group stage and Finals series (Note: The top two teams enter the Finals series at the semi-finals, while the teams ranked third to sixth enter the Finals series at the elimination-finals.)
2	Sydney FC (C)	27	16	4	7	43	29	+14	52	Qualification for 2020 AFC Champions League group stage and Finals series
3	Melbourne Victory	27	15	5	7	50	32	+18	50	Qualification for 2020 AFC Champions League preliminary round 2 and Finals series
4	Adelaide United	27	12	8	7	37	32	+5	44	Qualification for Finals series
5	Melbourne City	27	11	7	9	39	32	+7	40	Qualification for Finals series
6	Wellington Phoenix (Note: Wellington Phoenix cannot qualify for the AFC Champions League as they are not recognised as an AFC club.)	27	11	7	9	46	43	+3	40	Qualification for Finals series
7	Newcastle Jets	27	10	5	12	40	36	+4	35	
8	Western Sydney Wanderers	27	6	6	15	42	54	−12	24	
9	Brisbane Roar	27	4	6	17	38	71	−33	18	
10	Central Coast Mariners	27	3	4	20	31	70	−39	13	

Source: A-Leagues
Rules for classification: 1) points; 2) goal difference; 3) number of goals scored.
(C) Champions

==== Results summary ====
Overall								Home						Away					
Pld	W	D	L	GF	GA	GD	Pts	W	D	L	GF	GA	GD	W	D	L	GF	GA	GD
27	11	7	9	39	32	+7	40	7	5	1	25	12	+13	4	2	8	14	20	−6

Source: Ultimate A-League

==== Results by round ====
Round	1	2	3	4	5	6	7	8	9	10	11	13	12	14	15	16	17	18	19	20	21	22	23	24	25	26	27
Ground	A	A	H	H	A	H	A	A	H	A	H	H	A	H	H	A	A	H	A	A	H	A	A	H	H	A	H
Result	W	D	L	W	L	W	L	W	D	W	W	W	L	D	W	L	L	D	L	D	D	W	L	W	D	L	W
Position	1	3	5	3	5	5	5	4	4	4	4	4	4	4	4	4	5	5	5	5	6	5	6	6	6	6	5
Points	3	4	4	7	7	10	10	13	14	17	20	23	23	24	27	27	27	28	28	29	30	33	33	36	37	37	40

Source: Ultimate A-League
A = Away; H = Home; W = Win; D = Draw; L = Loss

==== Matches ====
Win Draw Loss

20 October 2018 1	Melbourne Victory	1–2	Melbourne City	Melbourne
19:50 AEDT	Honda 28'	Report	De Laet 40'; McGree 70'	Stadium: Marvel Stadium; Attendance: 40,504; Referee: Kurt Ams

27 October 2018 2	Central Coast Mariners	1–1	Melbourne City	Gosford
17:35 AEDT	McCormack 21'	Report	Vidošić 84'	Stadium: Central Coast Stadium; Attendance: 7,144; Referee: Stephen Lucas

2 November 2018 3	Melbourne City	0–3	Sydney FC	Melbourne
19:50 AEDT		Report	Retre 16'; Le Fondre 61', 90'	Stadium: AAMI Park; Attendance: 12,086; Referee: Adam Kersey

9 November 2018 4	Melbourne City	2–0	Wellington Phoenix	Melbourne
19:50 AEDT	De Laet 9'; Fornaroli 59'	Report		Stadium: AAMI Park; Attendance: 6,410; Referee: Adam Fielding

24 November 2018 5	Brisbane Roar	2–0	Melbourne City	Brisbane
18:50 AEST	Taggart 27', 66'	Report		Stadium: Suncorp Stadium; Attendance: 9,925; Referee: Ryuji Sato

2 December 2018 6	Melbourne City	3–0	Newcastle Jets	Melbourne
19:00 AEDT	McGree 2'; Brattan 45+3'; Wales 75'	Report		Stadium: AAMI Park; Attendance: 6,013; Referee: Alex King

8 December 2018 7	Perth Glory	1–0	Melbourne City	Perth
19:00 AWST	Ikonomidis 43'	Report		Stadium: nib Stadium; Attendance: 8,489; Referee: Peter Green

16 December 2018 8	Adelaide United	0–2	Melbourne City	Adelaide
18:30 ACDT		Report	Elsey 25' (o.g.); Brattan 50'	Stadium: Coopers Stadium; Attendance: 8,504; Referee: Chris Beath

22 December 2018 9	Melbourne City	1–1	Melbourne Victory	Melbourne
19:50 AEDT	Vidošić 90+2'	Report	Toivonen 55'	Stadium: AAMI Park; Attendance: 24,306; Referee: Shaun Evans

1 January 2019 10	Western Sydney Wanderers	0–2	Melbourne City	Sydney
19:50 AEDT		Report	Wales 35'; De Laet 37'	Stadium: ANZ Stadium; Attendance: 8,365; Referee: Adam Kersey

6 January 2019 11	Melbourne City	2–1	Newcastle Jets	Melbourne
17:00 AEDT	McGree 27' (pen.); Brattan 32'	Report	O'Donovan 4'	Stadium: AAMI Park; Attendance: 7,386; Referee: Kurt Ams

11 January 2019 13	Melbourne City	1–0	Brisbane Roar	Melbourne
19:50 AEDT	De Laet 52'	Report		Stadium: AAMI Park; Attendance: 6,348; Referee: Stephan Lucas

16 January 2019 12	Central Coast Mariners	2–1	Melbourne City	Gosford
19:50 AEDT	Pain 31'; Simon 89'	Report	Wales 77'	Stadium: Central Coast Stadium; Attendance: 4,103; Referee: Jarred Gillett

19 January 2019 14	Melbourne City	0–0	Perth Glory	Melbourne
19:50 AEDT		Report		Stadium: AAMI Park; Attendance: 6,055; Referee: Shaun Evans

22 January 2019 15	Melbourne City	4–3	Western Sydney Wanderers	Melbourne
19:50 AEDT	De Laet 1', 84'; Brattan 38'; Schenkeveld 90+4'	Report	Bonevacia 28' (pen.); Mourdoukoutas 49'; Sotirio 54'	Stadium: AAMI Park; Attendance: 5,419; Referee: Stephan Lucas

26 January 2019 16	Wellington Phoenix	1–0	Melbourne City	Wellington
15:35 NZDT	Williams 5'	Report		Stadium: Westpac Stadium; Attendance: 8,554; Referee: Jonathan Barreiro

3 February 2019 17	Sydney FC	2–0	Melbourne City	Sydney
17:00 AEDT	Ivanovic 9'; Le Fondre 86'	Report		Stadium: Jubilee Oval; Attendance: 13,029; Referee: Jarred Gillett

9 February 2019 18	Melbourne City	1–1	Adelaide United	Melbourne
19:50 AEDT	Maclaren 69'	Report	Goodwin 43'	Stadium: AAMI Park; Attendance: 6,569; Referee: Peter Green

15 February 2019 19	Newcastle Jets	3–1	Melbourne City	Newcastle
19:50 AEDT	Jair 22'; Champness 75'; O'Donovan 79'	Report	Maclaren 55'	Stadium: McDonald Jones Stadium; Attendance: 7,980; Referee: Adam Kersey

23 February 2019 20	Melbourne Victory	1–1	Melbourne City	Melbourne
19:50 AEDT	Barbarouses 50'	Report	Maclaren 16' (pen.)	Stadium: Marvel Stadium; Attendance: 32,431; Referee: Peter Green

3 March 2019 21	Melbourne City	2–2	Perth Glory	Melbourne
17:00 AEDT	Maclaren 26', 35' (pen.)	Report	Chianese 84'; Castro 90+1'	Stadium: AAMI Park; Attendance: 7,746; Referee: Alex King

17 March 2019 22	Sydney FC	0–2	Melbourne City	Sydney
19:00 AEDT		Report	Harrison 62'; Retre 79' (o.g.)	Stadium: Leichhardt Oval; Attendance: 6,261; Referee: Shaun Evans

30 March 2019 23	Western Sydney Wanderers	3–0	Melbourne City	Sydney
19:50 AEDT	Riera 35' (pen.), 84'; Duke 53'	Report		Stadium: ANZ Stadium; Attendance: 7,078; Referee: Daniel Elder

5 April 2019 24	Melbourne City	4–1	Brisbane Roar	Melbourne
19:50 AEDT	Griffiths 27'; Harrison 59'; De Laet 70'; McGree 90+4'	Report	Delbridge 54' (o.g.)	Stadium: AAMI Park; Attendance: 5,012; Referee: Adam Kersey

13 April 2019 25	Melbourne City	0–0	Adelaide United	Melbourne
16:35 AEDT		Report		Stadium: AAMI Park; Attendance: 7,720; Referee: Alex King

21 April 2019 26	Wellington Phoenix	3–2	Melbourne City	Wellington
16:00 NZDT	Krishna 27', 51', 90+4'	Report	McGree 42', 66'	Stadium: Westpac Stadium; Attendance: 8,294; Referee: Shaun Evans

26 April 2019 27	Melbourne City	5–0	Central Coast Mariners	Melbourne
19:50 AEDT	Harrison 35', 55'; McGree 42'; Vidošić 50'; Najjarine 90+2'	Report		Stadium: AAMI Park; Attendance: 4,950; Referee: Kurt Ams

==== Finals series ====
5 May 2019 Elimination-finals	Adelaide United	1–0 (a.e.t.)	Melbourne City	Adelaide
18:30 ACST	Halloran 119'	Report		Stadium: Coopers Stadium; Attendance: 13,232; Referee: Kurt Ams

=== FFA Cup ===
7 August 2018 Round of 32	Brisbane Roar	0–1 (a.e.t.)	Melbourne City	Brisbane
19:30 AEST		Report	Fornaroli 120'	Stadium: Dolphin Stadium; Attendance: 6,151; Referee: Casey Reibelt

29 August 2018 Round of 16	Melbourne City	1–0	Newcastle Jets	Melbourne
19:30 AEST	Fornaroli 54'	Report		Stadium: AAMI Park; Attendance: 3,673; Referee: Jonathan Barreiro

19 September 2018 Quarter-finals	Melbourne City	1–2	Western Sydney Wanderers	Melbourne
19:30 AEST	McGree 53'	Report	Riera 33'; Bonevacia 41'	Stadium: AAMI Park; Attendance: 1,800; Referee: Daniel Elder

== Statistics ==
=== Appearances and goals ===
Includes all competitions. Players with no appearances not included in the list.

No.	Pos.	Nat.	Name	A-League		FFA Cup		Total	
No.	Pos.	Nat.	Name	Apps	Goals	Apps	Goals	Apps	Goals
2	DF	(Belgium)	Ritchie De Laet	25	7	0(1)	0	26	7
3	DF	(Australia)	Scott Jamieson	21(2)	0	2(1)	0	26	0
4	DF	(Australia)	Harrison Delbridge	24	0	3	0	27	0
5	DF	(Netherlands)	Bart Schenkeveld	25	1	3	0	28	1
7	MF	(Australia)	Rostyn Griffiths	15(8)	1	3	0	26	1
8	MF	(Australia)	Riley McGree	18(9)	7	3	1	30	8
9	FW	(England)	Shayon Harrison	11	4	0	0	11	4
10	MF	(Australia)	Dario Vidošić	7(8)	3	3	0	18	3
13	DF	(Australia)	Nathaniel Atkinson	12(5)	0	2(1)	0	20	0
15	MF	(Australia)	Kearyn Baccus	26(1)	0	0	0	27	0
18	GK	(Australia)	Eugene Galekovic	27	0	3	0	30	0
19	FW	(Australia)	Lachlan Wales	16(10)	3	3	0	29	3
21	FW	(Australia)	Ramy Najjarine	0(13)	1	0	0	13	1
22	DF	(Australia)	Curtis Good	14(3)	0	0	0	17	0
25	DF	(Italy)	Iacopo La Rocca	6(2)	0	0	0	8	0
26	MF	(Australia)	Luke Brattan	25(1)	4	3	0	29	4
27	MF	(France)	Florin Berenguer	19(1)	0	0	0	20	0
29	FW	(Australia)	Jamie Maclaren	9	5	0	0	9	5
30	MF	(Australia)	Moudi Najjar	0(2)	0	0	0	2	0
34	MF	(Australia)	Connor Metcalfe	0(5)	0	0	0	5	0
36	DF	(Australia)	Dylan Pierias	0(2)	0	0	0	2	0
42	GK	(Australia)	James Delianov	1	0	0	0	1	0
51	MF	(Australia)	Idrus Abdulahi	0(1)	0	0	0	1	0
Player(s) transferred out but featured this season
6	MF	(Australia)	Osama Malik	2(3)	0	2	0	7	0
11	FW	(Scotland)	Michael O'Halloran	0(1)	0	0	0	1	0
17	MF	(Australia)	Anthony Caceres	1(4)	0	0(2)	0	7	0
23	FW	(Uruguay)	Bruno Fornaroli	4	1	3	2	7	3
39	MF	(Australia)	Anthony Lesiotis	0(1)	0	0(1)	0	2	0

=== Disciplinary record ===
Includes all competitions. The list is sorted by squad number when total cards are equal. Players with no cards not included in the list.

Rank	No.	Pos.	Nat.	Name	A-League			FFA Cup			Total		
Rank	No.	Pos.	Nat.	Name	Yellow card	Second yellow card	Red card	Yellow card	Second yellow card	Red card	Yellow card	Second yellow card	Red card
1	7	MF	(Australia)	Rostyn Griffiths	7	1	0	1	0	0	8	1	0
2	22	DF	(Australia)	Curtis Good	2	1	0	0	0	0	2	1	0
3	2	DF	(Belgium)	Ritchie De Laet	7	0	0	0	0	0	7	0	0
3	4	DF	(Australia)	Harrison Delbridge	7	0	0	0	0	0	7	0	0
3	15	MF	(Australia)	Kearyn Baccus	7	0	0	0	0	0	7	0	0
6	5	DF	(Netherlands)	Bart Schenkeveld	5	0	0	1	0	0	6	0	0
6	26	MF	(Australia)	Luke Brattan	5	0	0	1	0	0	6	0	0
8	3	DF	(Australia)	Scott Jamieson	5	0	0	0	0	0	5	0	0
9	8	MF	(Australia)	Riley McGree	4	0	0	0	0	0	4	0	0
9	13	DF	(Australia)	Nathaniel Atkinson	4	0	0	0	0	0	4	0	0
11	19	FW	(Australia)	Lachlan Wales	3	0	0	0	0	0	3	0	0
12	9	FW	(England)	Shayon Harrison	2	0	0	0	0	0	2	0	0
12	21	FW	(Australia)	Ramy Najjarine	2	0	0	0	0	0	2	0	0
12	25	DF	(Italy)	Iacopo La Rocca	2	0	0	0	0	0	2	0	0
12	27	MF	(France)	Florin Berenguer	2	0	0	0	0	0	2	0	0
16	1	GK	(Australia)	Eugene Galekovic	1	0	0	0	0	0	1	0	0
16	10	MF	(Australia)	Dario Vidošić	0	0	0	1	0	0	1	0	0
16	17	MF	(Australia)	Anthony Caceres	0	0	0	1	0	0	1	0	0
16	39	MF	(Australia)	Anthony Lesiotis	1	0	0	0	0	0	1	0	0

=== Clean sheets ===
Includes all competitions. The list is sorted by squad number when total clean sheets are equal. Players with no clean sheets not included in the list.

Rank	No.	Nat.	Name	A-League	FFA Cup	Total
1	1	(Australia)	Eugene Galekovic	8	2	10
2	42	(Australia)	James Delianov	1	0	1
Total				9	2	11
