= List of Melbourne City FC seasons =

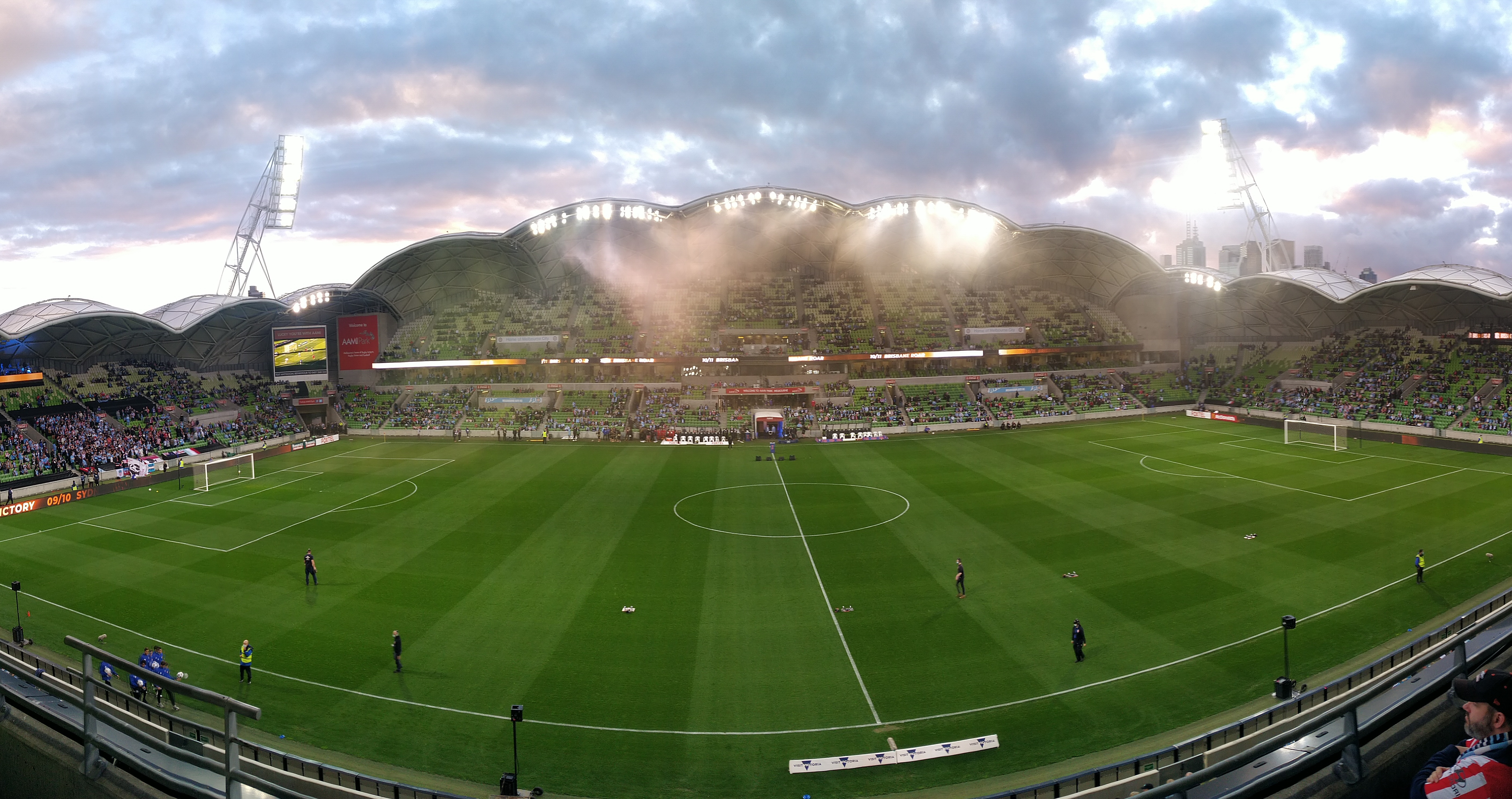
A panorama of AAMI Park prior to the 2021 A-League Grand Final.

Melbourne City Football Club is an association football club based in Cranbourne East, Melbourne. The club was formed in 2009 as Melbourne Heart before it was renamed to Melbourne City. They became the second Victorian member admitted into the A-League Men in 2010.

Melbourne City entered the A-League Men in the 2010–11 season, following the club's formation in 2009. The club was for its four seasons called Melbourne Heart FC, though ahead of the 2014–15 season it was bought by the City Football Group and rebranded Melbourne City FC.

As of the end of the 2024–25 season, the club's first team have spent 15 seasons in the top division Australian soccer. Their worst league finish to date is 10th in the A-League Men, their placing at the end of the 2013–14. The table details the club's achievements in major competitions, and the top scorers for each season. The club's longest period without a competitive honour is seven years, between the 2010–11 and 2016–17 seasons. Jamie Maclaren holds the record for most competitive goals in a single season for Melbourne City; he scored 29 during the 2019–20 campaign. The table details the club's achievements in major competitions, and the top scorers for each season.

== Key ==
Key to league competitions:

- A-League Men (A-League/A-League Men) – Australia's top soccer league, established in 2005

Key to colours and symbols:

1st or W	Winners
2nd or RU	Runners-up
3rd	Third
♦	Top scorer in division

Key to league record:

- Season = The year and article of the season
- Pos = Final position
- Pld = Games played
- W = Games won
- D = Games drawn
- L = Games lost
- GF = Goals scored
- GA = Goals against
- Pts = Points

Key to cup record:

- En-dash (–) = Melbourne City did not participate or cup not held
- DNQ = Did not qualify
- DNE = The club did not enter cup play
- Group = Group stage
- R32 = Round of 32
- R16 = Round of 16
- QF = Quarter-finals
- SF = Semi-finals
- RU = Runners-up
- W = Winners

== Seasons ==
Results of league and cup competitions by season
Season	League									Finals	Australia Cup	Other / Asia		Top goalscorer	
Season	Division	P	W	D	L	F	A	Pts	Pos	Finals	Australia Cup	Competition	Result	Name	Goals
2010–11	A-League	30	8	11	11	32	42	35	8th	DNQ	—	—	—	John Aloisi	8
2011–12	A-League	27	9	10	8	35	34	37	6th	SF	—	—	—	Eli Babalj	9
2012–13	A-League	27	8	3	16	31	40	27	9th	DNQ	—	—	—	Richard Garcia; Josip Tadic	6
2013–14	A-League	27	6	8	13	36	42	26	10th	DNQ	—	—	—	David Williams	12
2014–15	A-League	27	9	8	10	35	41	35	5th	SF	R32	—	—	Aaron Mooy	7
2015–16	A-League	27	13	5	9	63	44	44	4th	SF	SF	—	—	Bruno Fornaroli	28 ♦
2016–17	A-League	27	11	6	10	49	44	39	4th	EF	W	—	—	Bruno Fornaroli	20
2017–18	A-League	27	13	4	10	41	33	43	3rd	SF	QF	—	—	Ross McCormack	14
2018–19	A-League	27	11	7	9	39	32	40	5th	EF	QF	—	—	Riley McGree	8
2019–20	A-League	26	14	5	7	49	37	47	2nd	RU	RU	—	—	Jamie Maclaren	29 ♦
2020–21	A-League	26	15	4	7	57	32	49	1st	W	DNE (Note: Melbourne City did not enter the 2020 FFA Cup due to the event being cancelled following the COVID-19 pandemic in Australia, with only a limited number of preliminary rounds being played.)	Champions League	DNE (Note: All Australian representatives in the 2021 AFC Champions League, including Melbourne City, withdrew prior to their first matches in the competition.)	Jamie Maclaren	25 ♦
2021–22	A-League Men	26	14	7	5	55	33	49	1st	RU	QF	Champions League	Group	Jamie Maclaren	18 ♦
2022–23	A-League Men	26	16	7	3	61	32	55	1st	RU	R16	—	—	Jamie Maclaren	24 ♦
2023–24	A-League Men	27	11	6	10	50	38	39	6th	EF	SF	Champions League	Group	Tolgay Arslan	19
2024-25	A-League Men	26	14	6	6	41	25	48	2nd	W	R32	—	—		
