= 2019–20 Melbourne City FC season =

Melbourne City
2019–20 season
- Chairman: Khaldoon Al Mubarak
- Manager: Erick Mombaerts
- Stadium: AAMI Park
- A-League: 2nd
- A-League Finals: Runners-up
- FFA Cup: Runners-up
- Top goalscorer: League: Jamie Maclaren (23); All: Jamie Maclaren (29)
- Highest home attendance: 17,083 vs. Melbourne Victory (21 December 2019); A-League
- Lowest home attendance: 2,292 vs. Western Sydney Wanderers (14 March 2020); A-League
- Average home league attendance: 8,310
- Biggest win: 5–1 vs. Brisbane Strikers (A) (1 October 2019); FFA Cup; 4–0 vs. Newcastle Jets (A) (15 December 2019); A-League
- Biggest defeat: 0–4 vs. Adelaide United (A) (23 October 2019); FFA Cup
Home colours	Away colours	Third colours

The 2019–20 season was the tenth in the history of Melbourne City Football Club. In addition to the domestic league, Melbourne City competed in the Australia Cup for the sixth time.

The club appointed Erick Mombaerts to the vacant managerial role at the start of the season. On 24 March 2020, the FFA announced that the 2019–20 A-League season would be postponed until further notice due to the COVID-19 pandemic in Australia and New Zealand, and subsequently extended indefinitely. The season resumed on 17 July 2020.

In the 2019–20 season, Melbourne City qualified for though lost both the FFA Cup Final and A-League Grand Final, the latter being the first time it had qualified for a Grand Final. It finished the season in its highest ever place of second position, and in doing so qualified for a maiden AFC Champions League spot in 2021.

== Review ==
=== Pre-season ===
Melbourne City finished fifth in the previous season before being eliminated by Adelaide United by a single goal. Before the season started, Warren Joyce left the role as manager to join the Salford City development squad. The club appointed Erick Mombaerts as new manager on 27 June 2019. In the transfer market, they lost Dylan Pierias and Joshua Cavallo to the newest A-League club, Western United. After signing Scott Galloway from Adelaide United, Denis Genreau and Dean Bouzanis returned to the squad from their loan at Dutch club PEC Zwolle.

== Players ==
=== Squad information ===
Note: Flags indicate national team as defined under FIFA eligibility rules; some limited exceptions apply. Players may hold more than one non-FIFA nationality.

No.	Pos.	Nation	Player
1	GK	AUS	Tom Glover
2	DF	AUS	Scott Galloway
3	DF	AUS	Scott Jamieson (Captain)
4	DF	AUS	Harrison Delbridge
6	MF	AUS	Joshua Brillante
7	MF	AUS	Rostyn Griffiths
9	FW	AUS	Jamie Maclaren
10	MF	FRA	Florin Berenguer
11	FW	ENG	Craig Noone
13	MF	AUS	Nathaniel Atkinson
17	MF	AUS	Denis Genreau
19	MF	AUS	Lachlan Wales
20	MF	URU	Adrián Luna

No.	Pos.	Nation	Player
21	MF	AUS	Ramy Najjarine
22	DF	AUS	Curtis Good
30	FW	AUS	Moudi Najjar
34	MF	AUS	Connor Metcalfe
35	FW	AUS	Raphael Rodrigues (Scholarship)
36	DF	AUS	Kerrin Stokes (Scholarship)
37	FW	AUS	Gianluca Iannucci (Scholarship)
38	FW	AUS	Yaya Dukuly (Scholarship)
40	DF	AUT	Richard Windbichler
46	GK	AUS	Joe Gauci (Scholarship)
49	FW	AUS	Stefan Colakovski (Scholarship)
51	MF	AUS	Idrus Abdulahi (Scholarship)
59	MF	AUS	Bernardo Oliveira (Scholarship)

== Transfers ==
=== Transfers in ===
No.	Position	Player	Transferred from	Type/fee	Contract length	Date	Ref
2	DF	Scott Galloway	Adelaide United	Free transfer	3 years	3 May 2019	
17	MF	Denis Genreau	(Netherlands) PEC Zwolle	Loan return		8 May 2019	
23	GK	Dean Bouzanis	(Netherlands) PEC Zwolle	Loan return		8 May 2019	
11	MF	(England) Craig Noone	(England) Bolton Wanderers	Undisclosed	2 years	17 June 2019	
40	DF	(Austria) Richard Windbichler	Unattached	Free transfer	2 years	28 June 2019	
6	MF	Joshua Brillante	Sydney FC	Free transfer	2 years	8 July 2019	
8	MF	(Uruguay) Javier Cabrera	Unattached	Free transfer	2 years	9 July 2019	
20	FW	(Uruguay) Adrián Luna	Unattached	Free transfer	2 years	19 July 2019	
1	GK	Tom Glover	Unattached	Free transfer	2 years	6 August 2019	
36	DF	Kerrin Stokes	(Australia) Croydon Kings	Scholarship	2 years	9 September 2019	
46	GK	Joe Gauci	(Australia) Adelaide City	Scholarship	1 year	9 September 2019	
59	MF	Bernardo Oliveira	(Australia) FFSA NTC	Scholarship	1 year	7 November 2019	
14	FW	(Spain) Markel Susaeta	Unattached	Free transfer	0.5 year	16 January 2020	
5	DF	(Scotland) Jack Hendry	(Scotland) Celtic	Loan	0.5 year	22 January 2020	

=== Transfers out ===
No.	Position	Player	Transferred to	Type/fee	Date	Ref
36	DF	Dylan Pierias	Western United	Free transfer	20 March 2019	
38	MF	Joshua Cavallo	Western United	Free transfer	15 April 2019	
2	DF	(Belgium) Ritchie De Laet	(England) Aston Villa	Loan return	8 May 2019	
8	MF	Riley McGree	(Belgium) Club Brugge	Loan return	8 May 2019	
9	FW	(England) Shayon Harrison	(England) Tottenham Hotspur	Loan return	8 May 2019	
18	GK	Eugene Galekovic	Retired		8 May 2019	
42	GK	James Delianov	Western United	Free transfer	9 May 2019	
25	DF	(Italy) Iacopo La Rocca	Unattached	End of contract	9 May 2019	
10	MF	Dario Vidošić	Unattached	End of contract	3 June 2019	
26	MF	Luke Brattan	(England) Manchester City	Loan return	30 June 2019	
5	DF	(Netherlands) Bart Schenkeveld	Unattached	End of contract	2 July 2019	
15	MF	Kearyn Baccus	(South Africa) Kaizer Chiefs	Undisclosed	2 July 2019	
1	GK	Mark Birighitti	Central Coast Mariners	Free transfer	30 July 2019	
8	MF	(Uruguay) Javier Cabrera	Unattached	Mutual contract termination	12 January 2020	
14	FW	(Spain) Markel Susaeta	Unattached	End of contract	14 July 2020	
23	GK	Dean Bouzanis	Unattached	Mutual contract termination	25 July 2020	
5	DF	(Scotland) Jack Hendry	(Scotland) Celtic	End of loan	14 July 2020	

=== From youth squad ===
N	Pos.	Nat.	Name	Age	Notes
35	MF	(Australia)	Raphael Rodrigues	16	3 year scholarship contract
38	FW	(Australia)	Yaya Dukuly	16	2 year scholarship contract
49	FW	(Australia)	Stefan Colakovski	19	1 year scholarship contract
51	MF	(Australia)	Idrus Abdulahi	15	2 year scholarship contract

=== Contract extensions ===
No.	Name	Position	Duration	Date	Notes
22	Curtis Good	Centre-back	2 years	8 July 2019	
30	Moudi Najjar	Centre-forward	3 years	11 September 2019	
34	Connor Metcalfe	Midfielder	3 years	11 September 2019	
21	Ramy Najjarine	Attacking midfielder	3 years	17 October 2019	
49	Stefan Colakovski	Forward	2 years	28 January 2020	

== Technical staff ==
Position	Name
Head Coach	(France) Erick Mombaerts
Technical Director	(France) Alain Fiard
Senior Assistant Coach	(Australia) Patrick Kisnorbo
Goalkeeping Coach	(Australia) Neil Young
Head of Human Performance	(Australia) Andrew McKenzie
Performance Analysis Manager	(Australia) Donna Rice
Football Logistics Manager	(Australia) Josh Bondin

== Kits ==
Supplier: Puma / Sponsor: Etihad Airways / Sleeve sponsor: McDonald's

Home	Away	Third	Goalkeeper^{1}	Goalkeeper^{2}	Goalkeeper^{3}

== Pre-season and friendlies ==
Win Draw Loss

23 July 2019	Oakleigh Cannons (Australia)	3–4	(Australia) Melbourne City	Melbourne
	White 50'; Foschini 55'; Koutsakis 104'	Report	Metcalfe 25'; Maclaren 62'; Wales 110'; Najjar 120' (pen.)	Stadium: Jack Edwards Reserve; Attendance: 1,000

6 August 2019	Bentleigh Greens (Australia)	0–3	(Australia) Melbourne City	Melbourne
19:30 AEST		Report	Noone 45'; Luna 49'; Najjarine 74'	Stadium: Kingston Heath Soccer Complex

14 August 2019	Adelaide United (Australia)	0–1	(Australia) Melbourne City	Adelaide
14:00 ACST		Report	Maclaren 10'	Stadium: Coopers Stadium; Attendance: 0 (behind closed doors)

4 September 2019	Melbourne City (Australia)	2–0	(Australia) Central Coast Mariners	Melbourne
14:00	Berenguer 39'; Najjarine 42'	Report		Stadium: City Football Academy; Attendance: 0 (behind closed doors)

10 September 2019	Melbourne City (Australia)	1–2	(Australia) Western United	Melbourne
	Najjarine 47'	Report	Delbridge 30' (o.g.); Yuel 58'	Stadium: City Football Academy; Attendance: 0 (behind closed doors)

24 September 2019	Melbourne City (Australia)	1–2	(Australia) Adelaide United	Melbourne
	Maclaren 54'	Report	Toure 14'; Elsey 67'	Stadium: City Football Academy; Attendance: 0 (behind closed doors)

24 September 2019	Melbourne City (Australia)	5–3	(Australia) Adelaide United	Melbourne
	Najjar (?); Genreau (?); Wales (?); Atkinson (?)	Report (Melbourne City); Report (Adelaide United)	Opseth (?); King (?)	Stadium: City Football Academy; Attendance: 0 (behind closed doors)

== Competitions ==
=== Overall record ===
Competition	First match	Last match	Starting round	Final position	Record							
Competition	First match	Last match	Starting round	Final position	Pld	W	D	L	GF	GA	GD	Win %
A-League	12 October 2019	19 August 2020	Matchday 1	2nd	26	14	5	7	49	37	+12	53.85
A-League Finals	26 August 2020	30 August 2020	Semi-finals	Runners-up	2	1	0	1	2	1	+1	50.00
FFA Cup	31 July 2019	23 October 2019	Round of 32	Runners-up	5	4	0	1	13	7	+6	80.00
Total					33	19	5	9	64	45	+19	57.58

Source: Soccerway

=== A-League ===
==== League table ====
Pos	Team	Pld	W	D	L	GF	GA	GD	Pts	Qualification
1	Sydney FC (C)	26	16	5	5	49	25	+24	53	Qualification for 2021 AFC Champions League group stage and Finals series (Note: All Australian teams withdrew from the 2021 AFC Champions League on 4 June 2021.) (Note: The top two teams enter the Finals series at the semi-finals, while the teams ranked third to sixth enter the Finals series at the elimination-finals.)
2	Melbourne City	26	14	5	7	49	37	+12	47	Qualification for 2021 AFC Champions League qualifying play-offs and Finals series
3	Wellington Phoenix (Note: Wellington Phoenix cannot qualify for the 2021 AFC Champions League as they are not recognised as an AFC club.)	26	12	5	9	38	33	+5	41	Qualification for Finals series
4	Brisbane Roar	26	11	7	8	29	28	+1	40	Qualification for 2021 AFC Champions League qualifying play-offs and Finals series
5	Western United	26	12	3	11	46	37	+9	39	Qualification for Finals series
6	Perth Glory	26	10	7	9	43	36	+7	37	Qualification for Finals series
7	Adelaide United	26	11	3	12	44	49	−5	36	
8	Newcastle Jets	26	9	7	10	32	40	−8	34	
9	Western Sydney Wanderers	26	9	6	11	35	40	−5	33	
10	Melbourne Victory	26	6	5	15	33	44	−11	23	
11	Central Coast Mariners	26	5	3	18	26	55	−29	18	

Source: A-Leagues
Rules for classification: 1) points; 2) goal difference; 3) number of goals scored.
(C) Champions

==== Results summary ====
Overall								Home						Away					
Pld	W	D	L	GF	GA	GD	Pts	W	D	L	GF	GA	GD	W	D	L	GF	GA	GD
26	15	4	7	49	37	+12	49	9	2	2	22	15	+7	6	2	5	27	22	+5

Source: ultimatealeague.com

==== Results by round ====
Round	1	2	3	4	5	6	7	8	9	10	11	12	13	14	15	16	17	18	19	20	21	22	23	28	24	26	29	25	27
Ground	A	H	A	H	H	A	A	B	H	A	H	A	H	A	H	H	A	H	A	B	H	A	H	B	A	A	N	N	N
Result	D	W	W	W	W	L	W	B	L	W	L	L	W	D	W	D	L	W	L	B	W	W	D	B	W	L	W	D	W
Position	6	3	2	1	1	1	1	2	2	2	2	2	2	2	2	2	2	2	2	3	2	2	2	2	2	2	2	2	2
Points	1	4	7	10	13	13	16	16	16	19	19	19	22	23	26	27	27	30	30	30	33	36	37	37	40	40	43	44	47

Source: Ultimate A-League
A = Away; H = Home; N = Neutral; B = Bye; W = Win; D = Draw; L = Loss

==== Matches ====
12 October 2019 1	Melbourne Victory	0–0	Melbourne City	Melbourne
19:30 AEDT		Report		Stadium: Marvel Stadium; Attendance: 33,523; Referee: Chris Beath

20 October 2019 2	Melbourne City	2–1	Adelaide United	Melbourne
16:00 AEDT	Maclaren 24', 28'	Report	McGree 67'	Stadium: AAMI Park; Attendance: 7,399; Referee: Shaun Evans

27 October 2019 3	Western United	1–2	Melbourne City	Geelong
18:00 AEDT	Berisha 66' (pen.)	Report	Maclaren 32', 85'	Stadium: GMHBA Stadium; Attendance: 7,042; Referee: Adam Kersey

3 November 2019 4	Melbourne City	3–2	Wellington Phoenix	Melbourne
16:00 AEDT	Metcalfe 30'; Galloway 34'; Noone 63' (pen.)	Report	Hooper 24'; Waine 90+3'	Stadium: AAMI Park; Attendance: 6,440; Referee: Ben Abraham

8 November 2019 5	Melbourne City	3–1	Central Coast Mariners	Melbourne
19:30 AEDT	Good 17'; Luna 59'; Griffiths 82'	Report	Murray 89'	Stadium: AAMI Park; Attendance: 5,547; Referee: Stephen Lucas

17 November 2019 6	Brisbane Roar	4–3	Melbourne City	Brisbane
15:00 AEST	O'Donovan 50', 64' (pen.), 83' (pen.); Amadi-Holloway 60'	Report	Maclaren 6', 29', 51'	Stadium: Moreton Daily Stadium; Attendance: 9,387; Referee: Alex King

22 November 2019 7	Western Sydney Wanderers	2–3	Melbourne City	Sydney
20:00 AEDT	Yebaoh 2', 80'	Report	Maclaren 56' (pen.), 90+2'; Brillante 73'	Stadium: Bankwest Stadium; Attendance: 12,078; Referee: Chris Beath

6 December 2019 9	Melbourne City	0–3	Perth Glory	Melbourne
19:30 AEDT		Report	Fornaroli 27'; Delbridge 47' (o.g.); Mrcela 71'	Stadium: AAMI Park; Attendance: 6,679; Referee: Shaun Evans

15 December 2019 10	Newcastle Jets	0–4	Melbourne City	Newcastle
18:30 AEDT		Report	Luna 3', 28'; Cabrera 47'; Maclaren 59'	Stadium: McDonald Jones Stadium; Attendance: 8,133; Referee: Alireza Faghani

21 December 2019 11	Melbourne City	1–2	Melbourne Victory	Melbourne
17:00 AEDT	Delbridge 56'	Report	Toivonen 15', 41'	Stadium: AAMI Park; Attendance: 17,083; Referee: Alex King

29 December 2019 12	Sydney FC	2–1	Melbourne City	Sydney
18:30 AEDT	Le Fondre 29'; Barbarouses 84'	Report	Metcalfe 22'	Stadium: Netstrata Jubilee Stadium; Attendance: 17,421; Referee: Kurt Ams

3 January 2020 13	Melbourne City	3–2	Western United	Melbourne
19:30 AEDT	Maclaren 5', 44'; Luna 36'	Report	Berisha 75' (pen.); Diamanti 79' (pen.)	Stadium: AAMI Park; Attendance: 8,577; Referee: Adam Kersey

11 January 2020 14	Brisbane Roar	2–2	Melbourne City	Brisbane
16:00 AEDT	Inman 34', 45+3'	Report	Noone 39'; Atkinson 48'	Stadium: Suncorp Stadium; Attendance: 10,659; Referee: Daniel Elder

18 January 2020 15	Melbourne City	2–0	Newcastle Jets	Melbourne
19:30 AEDT	Noone 8'; Maclaren 63' (pen.)	Report		Stadium: AAMI Park; Attendance: 6,857; Referee: Kate Jacewicz

25 January 2020 16	Melbourne City	0–0	Perth Glory	Melbourne
19:30 AEDT		Report		Stadium: AAMI Park; Attendance: 6,103; Referee: Daniel Elder

1 February 2020 17	Adelaide United	3–1	Melbourne City	Adelaide
19:00 ACDT	Halloran 12', 41'; Blackwood 45+2'	Report	Noone 16'	Stadium: Coopers Stadium; Attendance: 7,068; Referee: Alex King

7 February 2020 18	Melbourne City	2–1	Melbourne Victory	Melbourne
19:30 AEDT	Berenguer 8'; Maclaren 71'	Report	Toivonen 78'	Stadium: AAMI Park; Attendance: 16,872; Referee: Shaun Evans

15 February 2020 19	Wellington Phoenix	1–0	Melbourne City	Auckland
19:00 NZDT	Ball 58'	Report		Stadium: Eden Park; Attendance: 15,347; Referee: Alex King

1 March 2020 21	Melbourne City	1–0	Brisbane Roar	Melbourne
18:30 AEDT	Young 55' (o.g.)	Report		Stadium: AAMI Park; Attendance: 7,559; Referee: Shaun Evans

8 March 2020 22	Perth Glory	2–3	Melbourne City	Perth
15:00 AWST	Chianese 53'; Fornaroli 65'	Report	Griffiths 24'; Berenguer 30'; Susaeta 34'	Stadium: HBF Park; Attendance: 8,107; Referee: Kurt Ams

14 March 2020 23	Melbourne City	1–1	Western Sydney Wanderers	Melbourne
19:30 AEDT	Maclaren 30' (pen.)	Report	Russell 21'	Stadium: AAMI Park; Attendance: 2,292; Referee: Kate Jacewicz

20 March 2020 24	Central Coast Mariners	2–4	Melbourne City	Gosford
17:30 AEDT	Murray 2', 69'	Report	Maclaren 5', 48', 74'; Susaeta 10'	Stadium: Central Coast Stadium; Attendance: 0 (behind closed doors due to COVID-19 pandemic in Australia); Referee: Kurt Ams

23 March 2020 26	Newcastle Jets	2–1	Melbourne City	Newcastle
19:30 AEDT	Fitzgerald 45+1'; Ugarkovic 78'	Report	Berenguer 70'	Stadium: McDonald Jones Stadium; Attendance: 0 (behind closed doors due to COVID-19 pandemic in Australia); Referee: Ben Abraham

Season postponement due to COVID-19 pandemic in Australia

1 August 2020 29	Melbourne City	2–0	Sydney FC	Sydney
17:00 AEST	Noone 57'; Maclaren 68'	Report		Stadium: ANZ Stadium; Attendance: 0 (behind closed doors due to COVID-19 pandemic in Australia); Referee: Ben Abraham
Note: Match originally scheduled for 26 April 2020 at AAMI Park, but postponed and relocated due to the COVID-19 pandemic in Australia. It was rescheduled to 1 August 2020 at ANZ Stadium.

11 August 2020 25	Melbourne City	2–2	Adelaide United	Sydney
19:30 AEST	Luna 34'; Maclaren 40'	Report	Opseth 78' (pen.); Halloran 90+1'	Stadium: ANZ Stadium; Attendance: 0 (behind closed doors due to COVID-19 pandemic in Australia); Referee: Alex King
Note: Match originally scheduled for 27 March 2020 at AAMI Park, but postponed and relocated due to the COVID-19 pandemic in Australia. It was rescheduled to 11 August 2020 at ANZ Stadium.

19 August 2020 27	Western United	1–3	Melbourne City	Sydney
19:30 AEST	Berisha 70'	Report	Najjar 12'; Maclaren 57' (pen.), 86'	Stadium: Netstrata Jubilee Stadium; Attendance: 0 (behind closed doors due to COVID-19 pandemic in Australia); Referee: Tim Danaskos
Note: Match originally scheduled for 10 April 2020 at Mars Stadium, but postponed and relocated due to the COVID-19 pandemic in Australia. It was rescheduled to 19 August 2020 at Netstrata Jubilee Stadium.

==== Finals series ====
26 August 2020 Semi-finals	Melbourne City	2–0	Western United	Sydney
17:00 AEST	Maclaren 68'; Imai 84' (o.g.)	Report		Stadium: Bankwest Stadium; Attendance: 1,897; Referee: Alireza Faghani

30 August 2020 Grand Final	Sydney FC	1–0 (a.e.t.)	Melbourne City	Sydney
18:30 AEST	Grant 100'	Report		Stadium: Bankwest Stadium; Attendance: 7,051; Referee: Chris Beath

=== FFA Cup ===
As an A-League team, Melbourne City automatically qualified through to the Round of 32 as one of the ten A-League clubs competing in the competition. In the opening round they took on South Australian side Campbelltown City who won the previous years National Premier Leagues title.

31 July 2019 Round of 32	Campbelltown City	1–3	Melbourne City	Adelaide
19:30 AEST	Fyfe 26' (pen.)	Report	Maclaren 11', 90+3'; Noone 31'	Stadium: Steve Woodcock Sports Centre; Attendance: 3,078; Referee: Adam Bavcar

21 August 2019 Round of 16	Marconi Stallions	1–2	Melbourne City	Sydney
19:30 AEST	Fernandez 85'	Report	Maclaren 2'; Noone 44'	Stadium: Marconi Stadium; Attendance: 1,947; Referee: Stephen Lucas

18 September 2019 Quarter-finals	Melbourne City	3–0	Western Sydney Wanderers	Melbourne
19:30 AEST	Noone 34', 81'; Maclaren 44'	Report		Stadium: AAMI Park; Attendance: 2,905; Referee: Stephen Lucas

1 October 2019 Semi-finals	Brisbane Strikers	1–5	Melbourne City	Brisbane
19:30 AEDT	Pengelly 3'	Report	Metcalfe 30'; Maclaren 48', 80'; Cabrera 62'; Galloway 90+2'	Stadium: Perry Park; Attendance: 3,706; Referee: Adam Kersey

23 October 2019 Final	Adelaide United	4–0	Melbourne City	Adelaide
19:00 ACDT	Toure 25'; Halloran 49'; Mileusnic 60'; McGree 75'	Report		Stadium: Coopers Stadium; Attendance: 14,920; Referee: Alex King

== Statistics ==
=== Appearances and goals ===
Includes all competitions. Players with no appearances not included in the list.

No.	Pos	Nat	Player	Total		A-League		A-League Finals		FFA Cup	
No.	Pos	Nat	Player	Apps	Goals	Apps	Goals	Apps	Goals	Apps	Goals
1	GK	(Australia) AUS	Tom Glover	15	0	13	0	2	0	0	0
2	DF	(Australia) AUS	Scott Galloway	27	2	12+8	1	0+2	0	5	1
3	DF	(Australia) AUS	Scott Jamieson	27	0	22	0	0	0	5	0
4	DF	(Australia) AUS	Harrison Delbridge	29	1	18+4	1	2	0	5	0
6	MF	(Australia) AUS	Joshua Brillante	33	1	25+1	1	2	0	5	0
7	DF	(Australia) AUS	Rostyn Griffiths	22	2	15+4	2	0+2	0	0+1	0
9	FW	(Australia) AUS	Jamie Maclaren	30	29	23	22	2	1	5	6
10	MF	(France) FRA	Florin Berenguer	21	3	13+2	3	2	0	3+1	0
11	MF	(England) ENG	Craig Noone	32	9	24+1	5	2	0	5	4
13	DF	(Australia) AUS	Nathaniel Atkinson	23	1	13+8	1	2	0	0	0
17	MF	(Australia) AUS	Denis Genreau	8	0	4+2	0	0	0	0+2	0
19	FW	(Australia) AUS	Lachlan Wales	30	0	12+13	0	2	0	1+2	0
20	MF	(Uruguay) URU	Adrián Luna	30	5	18+5	5	2	0	2+3	0
21	FW	(Australia) AUS	Ramy Najjarine	12	0	2+6	0	0+1	0	2+1	0
22	DF	(Australia) AUS	Curtis Good	31	1	24	1	2	0	5	0
30	FW	(Australia) AUS	Moudi Najjar	7	1	2+3	1	0+1	0	0+1	0
34	MF	(Australia) AUS	Connor Metcalfe	23	3	9+7	2	0+2	0	5	1
35	FW	(Australia) AUS	Raphael Borges Rodrigues	1	0	0+1	0	0	0	0	0
39	MF	(Australia) AUS	Idrus Abdulahi	1	0	0+1	0	0	0	0	0
40	DF	(Austria) AUT	Richard Windbichler	10	0	5+1	0	2	0	0+2	0
49	FW	(Australia) AUS	Stefan Colakovski	7	0	1+5	0	0+1	0	0	0
Player(s) transferred out but featured this season
5	DF	(Scotland) SCO	Jack Hendry	2	0	2	0	0	0	0	0
8	FW	(Uruguay) URU	Javier Cabrera	13	2	7+2	1	0	0	2+2	1
14	FW	(Spain) ESP	Markel Susaeta	10	2	9+1	2	0	0	0	0
23	GK	(Australia) AUS	Dean Bouzanis	18	0	13	0	0	0	5	0

=== Disciplinary record ===
Includes all competitions. The list is sorted by squad number when total cards are equal. Players with no cards not included in the list.

No.	Pos	Nat	Player	Total			A-League			A-League Finals			FFA Cup		
No.	Pos	Nat	Player	Yellow card	Second yellow card	Red card	Yellow card	Second yellow card	Red card	Yellow card	Second yellow card	Red card	Yellow card	Second yellow card	Red card
4	DF	(Australia) AUS	Harrison Delbridge	4	1	2	4	1	2	0	0	0	0	0	0
11	MF	(England) ENG	Craig Noone	4	0	1	4	0	1	0	0	0	0	0	0
3	DF	(Australia) AUS	Scott Jamieson	9	0	0	8	0	0	0	0	0	1	0	0
20	MF	(Uruguay) URU	Adrián Luna	8	0	0	5	0	0	1	0	0	2	0	0
6	MF	(Australia) AUS	Joshua Brillante	5	0	0	3	0	0	1	0	0	1	0	0
7	DF	(Australia) AUS	Rostyn Griffiths	5	0	0	5	0	0	0	0	0	0	0	0
13	DF	(Australia) AUS	Nathaniel Atkinson	5	0	0	4	0	0	1	0	0	0	0	0
2	DF	(Australia) AUS	Scott Galloway	4	0	0	4	0	0	0	0	0	0	0	0
10	MF	(France) FRA	Florin Berenguer	4	0	0	4	0	0	0	0	0	0	0	0
17	MF	(Australia) AUS	Denis Genreau	4	0	0	3	0	0	0	0	0	1	0	0
40	DF	(Austria) AUT	Richard Windbichler	4	0	0	3	0	0	1	0	0	0	0	0
22	DF	(Australia) AUS	Curtis Good	3	0	0	3	0	0	0	0	0	0	0	0
19	FW	(Australia) AUS	Lachlan Wales	2	0	0	1	0	0	1	0	0	0	0	0
23	GK	(Australia) AUS	Dean Bouzanis	2	0	0	2	0	0	0	0	0	0	0	0
34	MF	(Australia) AUS	Connor Metcalfe	2	0	0	2	0	0	0	0	0	0	0	0
1	GK	(Australia) AUS	Tom Glover	1	0	0	1	0	0	0	0	0	0	0	0
8	FW	(Uruguay) URU	Javier Cabrera	1	0	0	1	0	0	0	0	0	0	0	0
9	FW	(Australia) AUS	Jamie Maclaren	1	0	0	1	0	0	0	0	0	0	0	0
30	FW	(Australia) AUS	Moudi Najjar	1	0	0	1	0	0	0	0	0	0	0	0

- (yellow card) = Number of bookings; (second yellow card) = Number of sending offs after a second yellow card; (red card) = Number of sending offs by a direct red card.

=== Clean sheets ===
Includes all competitions. The list is sorted by squad number when total clean sheets are equal. Numbers in parentheses represent games where both goalkeepers participated and both kept a clean sheet; the number in parentheses is awarded to the goalkeeper who was substituted on, whilst a full clean sheet is awarded to the goalkeeper who was on the field at the start of play. Goalkeepers with no clean sheets not included in the list.

Rank	No.	Nat.	Goalkeeper	A-League	A-League Finals	FFA Cup	Total
1	1	(Australia)	Tom Glover	3	1	0	4
1	23	(Australia)	Dean Bouzanis	3	0	1	4
Total				6	1	1	8
