= Javier Cabrera (footballer) =

Uruguayan footballer (born 1992)

Personal information
- Full name: Marcelo Javier Cabrera Rivera
- Date of birth: 18 March 1992 (age 34)
- Place of birth: Florida, Uruguay
- Height: 1.68 m (5 ft 6 in)
- Position: Winger

Team information
- Current team: Peñarol
- Number: 7

Youth career
- Montevideo Wanderers

Senior career*
Years	Team	Apps	(Gls)
2010–2017	Montevideo Wanderers	125	(7)
2014–2015	→ Recreativo (loan)	21	(0)
2016–2017	→ Argentinos Juniors (loan)	38	(6)
2017–2018	Argentinos Juniors	26	(1)
2018–2019	Toluca	5	(0)
2019	Montevideo Wanderers	12	(1)
2019–2020	Melbourne City	9	(1)
2020	Unión Santa Fe	13	(2)
2021–2023	Argentinos Juniors	103	(4)
2024–	Peñarol	48	(6)
- * Club domestic league appearances and goals as of 1 October 2025

Marcelo Javier Cabrera Rivera (born 18 March 1992) is a Uruguayan footballer who plays for Peñarol as a right winger.

== Club career ==
Born in Florida, Cabrera graduated from Montevideo Wanderers F.C.'s youth setup. On 11 April 2010, he played his first match as a professional, coming on as a late substitute in a 1–1 away draw against Liverpool F.C. for the Uruguayan Primera División championship.

Cabrera scored his first professional goal on 2 October 2010, in a 2–0 away win against Racing Club de Montevideo. He appeared regularly for the club in the following three campaigns, but with his side only achieving mid-table positions.

On 21 July 2014 Cabrera signed a one-year loan deal with Recreativo de Huelva, in Spanish Segunda División. He made his debut for the club on 31 August, starting in a 0–0 away draw against Deportivo Alavés.

On 9 July 2019, Cabrera was signed on a 2-year deal by Australian A-League club Melbourne City.
