= Christian Cavallo =

Australian professional football player

Personal information
- Full name: Christian Cavallo
- Date of birth: 18 August 1996 (age 30)
- Place of birth: Australia
- Position: Defender

Team information
- Current team: Bentleigh Greens
- Number: 18

Youth career
- 2014–2016: Melbourne Victory
- 2016–2018: Melbourne City

Senior career*
| Years | Team | Apps | (Gls) |
| 2014 | Bentleigh Greens | 17 | (0) |
| 2015–2016 | Melbourne Victory NPL | 27 | (0) |
| 2015 | Melbourne Victory | 0 | (0) |
| 2016 | Bulleen Lions | 8 | (1) |
| 2016–2018 | Melbourne City | 1 | (0) |
| 2018 | Green Gully | 12 | (0) |
| 2019–2020 | Dandenong Thunder | 23 | (5) |
| 2021 | Dandenong City | 6 | (0) |
| 2022–2024 | Bentleigh Greens | 27 | (1) |
- * Club domestic league appearances and goals as of 29 January 2025 ‡ National team caps and goals as of 28 October 2016

Christian Cavallo is an Australian professional football (soccer) player who plays as a defender for Bentleigh Greens in the NPL Victoria. He made his debut for the Melbourne City senior team on 28 October 2016, coming on in the 90th minute in a 2–1 win. He was released by Melbourne City on 3 May 2018.
