= Florin Berenguer =

French footballer (born 1989)

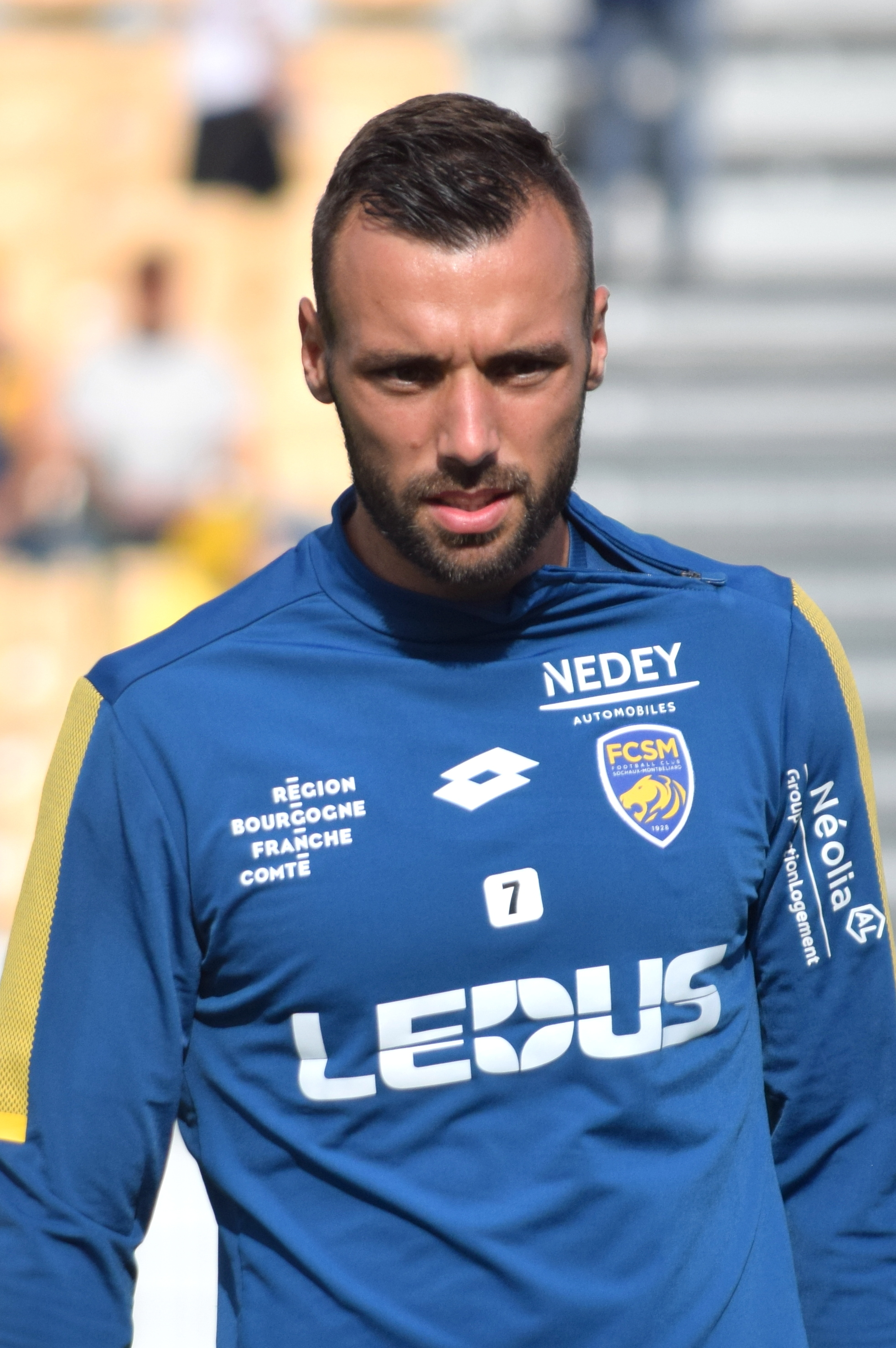
- Berenguer in 2017

Personal information
- Full name: Florin Gabin Berenguer-Bohrer
- Date of birth: 1 April 1989 (age 37)
- Place of birth: Montbéliard, France
- Height: 1.80 m (5 ft 11 in)
- Position: Attacking midfielder

Youth career
- 2000–2009: Sochaux

Senior career*
Years	Team	Apps	(Gls)
2009–2014	Dijon	112	(10)
2014	Dijon II	1	(0)
2014–2018	Sochaux	84	(11)
2015–2017	Sochaux II	8	(1)
2018–2023	Melbourne City	107	(10)
2023–2025	Brisbane Roar	41	(5)
- * Club domestic league appearances and goals as of 7 May 2025

Florin Berenguer-Bohrer (born 1 April 1989) is a French professional footballer who plays as an attacking midfielder.

== Club career ==
Berenguer trained at the youth academy of Sochaux. He began his senior career in 2009 for Dijon FCO, playing in both Ligue 1 and Ligue 2. In mid-2014, he transferred to his former club Sochaux-Montbéliard, also of Ligue 2, where he stayed for close to four years.

In September 2018, Berenguer was picked up by Australian A-League club Melbourne City ahead of the 2018–19 season.

After 5 years with Melbourne City, Berenguer left the club in August 2023 and signed a two-year contract with Brisbane Roar a couple of days later. After two seasons with the club, Berenguer departed having made 41 league appearances and scoring 5 goals.

== Honours ==
Melbourne City

- A-League Premiership: 2020–21, 2021–22, 2022–23
- A-League Championship: 2021

Individual

- PFA A-League Team of the Season: 2021–22
