= Idrus Abdulahi =

Soccer player

Personal information
- Full name: Idrus Shaban Abdulahi
- Date of birth: 22 September 2003 (age 23)
- Place of birth: Ethiopia
- Height: 1.74 m (5 ft 8 1/2 in)
- Position: Midfielder

Youth career
- Brunswick City
- Melbourne City

Senior career*
Years	Team	Apps	(Gls)
2018–2021	Melbourne City NPL	18	(0)
2018–2021	Melbourne City	2	(0)

International career^{‡}
2019	Australia U17	6	(0)
- * Club domestic league appearances and goals as of 12 January 2020 ‡ National team caps and goals as of 12 November 2019

Idrus Shaban Abdulahi (born 22 September 2003) is a professional soccer player who last played as a midfielder for A-League Men club Melbourne City. Born in Ethiopia, he represented Australia at youth level.

== Early life ==
Born in Ethiopia among seven siblings, Abdulahi's family settled as refugees in Melbourne, Australia in 2010. He joined his first football club with Brunswick City in their under-10s, where he would stay for two years before being signed by Melbourne City Youth. Abdulahi attended Maribyrnong College during his high school years and continued training at Brunswick despite being under contract with Melbourne City.

== Club career ==
=== Melbourne City ===
After sitting on the bench for most of the 2018–19 season with Melbourne City, Abdulahi made his debut at Melbourne Rectangular Stadium on 26 April 2019 in a 5–0 rout of Central Coast Mariners, replacing Dario Vidošić in the 81st minute. Although he missed the record by eight days, Abdulahi became the second youngest debutant in A-League history, aged 15 years and 220 days, behind Teeboy Kamara who made his maiden appearance aged 15 years and 212 days. On 9 September, Abdulahi signed on a two-year scholarship contract with Melbourne City, finishing the season with one league appearance.

== International career ==
On 2 October 2019, Abdulahi was selected in the Joeys squad for the 2019 FIFA U-17 World Cup. He played in all of the Joeys' Group B games, playing the full 90 minutes against Hungary and Nigeria as they progressed to the Knockout stage. He started in their Round of 16 clash with France on 7 November 2019, losing 4-0 and being eliminated from the competition.
