= 2024 in Queensland soccer =

Football Queensland
- Season: 2024

The 2024 Football Queensland season was the 12th season since NPL Queensland commenced as the highest-ranking level of Queensland men's football. The 2024 season was also the seventh season of the Football Queensland Premier League and the fourth season of the Football Queensland Premier League 2, representing the second and third tiers of Queensland men's football respectively.

== Men's League Tables ==
=== 2024 National Premier Leagues Queensland ===
NPL Queensland
- Season: 2024
- Dates: 23 February-6 September
- Matches: 81
- Goals: 301 (3.72 per match)

The 2024 National Premier Leagues Queensland season was the 12th season of first division football in Queensland under the National Premier Leagues banner. The season ran from 23 February to 18 August, as a double round-robin over 22 rounds, followed by a finals series.

==== League table ====
Pos	Team	Pld	W	D	L	GF	GA	GD	Pts	Qualification or relegation
1	Gold Coast Knights	22	19	1	2	63	25	+38	58	Qualification for Finals
2	Moreton City Excelsior	22	15	4	3	60	26	+34	49	Qualification for Finals
3	Peninsula Power	22	15	2	5	50	25	+25	47	Qualification for Finals
4	Lions FC (C)	22	13	3	6	62	31	+31	42	Qualification for Finals
5	Wynnum Wolves	22	11	2	9	43	62	−19	35	
6	Olympic FC	22	7	5	10	32	32	0	26	
7	Gold Coast United	22	5	9	8	29	33	−4	24	
8	Brisbane Roar Youth	22	6	6	10	33	43	−10	24	
9	Sunshine Coast Wanderers	22	6	4	12	28	44	−16	22	
10	Brisbane City	22	6	2	14	28	44	−16	20	
11	Rochedale Rovers (R)	22	4	4	14	18	47	−29	16	Relegation to 2025 FQPL 1
12	Redlands United (R)	22	1	6	15	19	53	−34	9	Relegation to 2025 FQPL 1

Source: squadi
Rules for classification: 1) points; 2) goal difference; 3) number of goals scored; 4) head to head record.
(C) Champions; (R) Relegated

==== Results ====
Home \ Away	BCY	BRI	GCK	GCU	LFC	MCE	OLY	PEN	RED	ROC	SCW	WYN
Brisbane City		1–0	1–2	1–1	0–3	0–1	0–4	2–4	1–0	0–0	3–2	2–3
Brisbane Roar Youth	2–3		0–1	1–1	0–5	1–3	3–2	1–1	2–4	1–1	2–0	1–1
Gold Coast Knights	3–1	4–2		5–1	5–0	2–5	3–1	3–2	4–1	2–0	4–2	9–0
Gold Coast United	3–0	0–3	1–2		3–2	0–0	1–1	2–3	4–0	2–2	0–0	2–1
Lions	6–0	1–2	1–1	2–2		1–2	3–2	3–1	0–0	3–2	4–0	3–4
Moreton City Excelsior	3–1	3–2	2–3	3–0	2–4		1–1	1–3	7–0	2–0	5–0	6–3
Olympic	3–1	1–1	0–1	0–0	0–2	1–1		0–3	3–0	2–0	0–2	3–1
Peninsula Power	1–0	4–0	1–0	3–1	0–3	0–0	3–1		3–2	2–1	1–2	5–0
Redlands United	0–2	1–1	0–1	0–0	2–4	0–1	1–3	0–4		0–1	2–2	0–1
Rochedale Rovers	0–8	1–5	1–2	2–0	0–4	1–3	0–1	0–2	2–2		1–0	1–4
Sunshine Coast Wanderers	2–1	3–0	0–1	0–4	3–1	3–5	1–0	1–3	2–2	0–1		1–1
Wynnum Wolves	1–0	2–3	3–5	2–1	0–7	0–4	4–3	2–1	5–2	2–1	3–2	

Source: Soccerway
Legend: Blue = home team win; Yellow = draw; Red = away team win.

==== Finals ====
Semifinals
1	Gold Coast Knights	0
4	Lions FC	1
2	Moreton City Excelsior (a.e.t.)	4
3	Peninsula Power	3

Grand final
4	Lions FC	1
2	Moreton City Excelsior	0

=== 2024 Football Queensland Premier League 1 ===
Football Queensland Premier League 1
- Season: 2024
- Dates: 23 February-6 September
- Matches: 80
- Goals: 325 (4.06 per match)

The 2024 Football Queensland Premier League 1 season was the seventh season of second division football in Queensland under the Football Queensland Premier League banner. The season ran from 23 February to 18 August, as a double round-robin over 22 rounds, followed by a finals series.

==== League table ====
Pos	Team	Pld	W	D	L	GF	GA	GD	Pts	Qualification or relegation
1	St George Willawong	22	17	2	3	52	24	+28	53	Promotion to 2025 NPL Queensland and qualification for Finals
2	Eastern Suburbs (C)	22	14	2	6	65	34	+31	44	Promotion to 2025 NPL Queensland and qualification for Finals
3	Brisbane Strikers	22	13	4	5	61	32	+29	43	Qualification for Finals
4	Logan Lightning	22	12	3	7	52	32	+20	39	Qualification for Finals
5	Broadbeach United	22	12	3	7	50	37	+13	39	
6	Caboolture Sports	22	12	3	7	47	40	+7	39	
7	Southside Eagles	22	10	2	10	35	36	−1	32	
8	SWQ Thunder	22	8	2	12	39	42	−3	26	
9	Capalaba FC	22	6	3	13	42	45	−3	21	
10	Ipswich FC	22	5	5	12	19	47	−28	20	
11	Moreton City Excelsior Reserves (R)	22	3	3	16	27	77	−50	12	Relegation to 2025 FQPL 2
12	Mitchelton (R)	22	3	2	17	27	70	−43	11	Relegation to 2025 FQPL 2

Source: squadi
Rules for classification: 1) points; 2) goal difference; 3) number of goals scored; 4) head to head record.
(C) Champions; (R) Relegated

==== Results ====
Home \ Away	BRS	BRU	CAB	CAP	EAS	IPS	LOG	MIT	MOR	SOU	SGW	THU
Brisbane Strikers		2–2	3–1	3–1	3–3	4–1	4–1	1–0	4–1	2–1	1–0	1–1
Broadbeach United	3–2		0–3	4–1	2–1	1–2	2–1	3–0	5–0	1–1	2–4	4–1
Caboolture Sports	0–3	1–4		2–1	4–4	3–0	1–1	3–1	3–2	4–0	2–3	2–1
Capalaba FC	1–4	1–4	1–4		0–2	0–5	1–2	5–0	2–3	0–1	1–3	2–0
Eastern Suburbs	2–1	2–1	3–0	5–2		3–0	3–2	4–2	7–1	3–2	1–3	2–4
Ipswich FC	0–6	2–1	1–2	1–1	0–5		1–2	4–2	1–1	2–0	0–3	2–1
Logan Lightning	3–2	6–0	1–2	1–1	2–0	1–1		4–0	5–0	3–0	1–2	2–0
Mitchelton	2–5	1–2	2–3	1–7	0–6	0–0	5–3		3–4	1–1	0–2	2–1
Moreton City Excelsior Reserves	1–4	0–3	3–3	0–5	0–4	1–1	1–5	0–3		3–1	2–4	1–4
Southside Eagles	1–0	3–2	2–0	1–3	3–2	1–0	2–3	4–1	5–1		2–0	1–3
St George Willawong	3–2	2–2	4–0	2–2	2–1	2–0	3–1	3–1	2–0	0–2		4–1
SWQ Thunder	4–4	1–2	0–4	2–1	0–2	4–0	1–2	5–0	3–2	2–1	0–1	

Source: squadi
Legend: Blue = home team win; Yellow = draw; Red = away team win.

==== Finals ====
Semifinals
1	St George Willawong	2
4	Logan Lightning	1
2	Eastern Suburbs	2
3	Brisbane Strikers	1

Grand final
1	St George Willawong	2
2	Eastern Suburbs (a.e.t.)	3

=== 2024 Football Queensland Premier League 2 ===
Football Queensland Premier League 2
- Season: 2024
- Dates: 1 March-13 September
- Matches: 77
- Goals: 361 (4.69 per match)

The 2024 Football Queensland Premier League 2 season was the fourth season of third division football in Queensland under the Football Queensland Premier League 2 banner. The season ran from 1 March to 24 August, as a double round-robin over 22 rounds, followed by a finals series.

==== League table ====
Pos	Team	Pld	W	D	L	GF	GA	GD	Pts	Qualification or relegation
1	Holland Park Hawks	22	18	3	1	69	28	+41	57	Promotion to 2025 FQPL 1 and qualification for Finals
2	Magic United (C)	22	16	0	6	68	37	+31	48	Promotion to 2025 FQPL 1 and qualification for Finals
3	North Star	22	13	2	7	48	34	+14	41	Qualification for Finals
4	Grange Thistle	22	11	7	4	60	40	+20	40	Qualification for Finals
5	Pine Hills	22	13	1	8	50	35	+15	40	
6	Souths United	22	9	2	11	46	60	−14	29	
7	Samford Rangers	22	8	4	10	58	53	+5	28	
8	Maroochydore FC	22	8	3	11	61	59	+2	27	
9	Taringa Rovers	22	6	3	13	47	66	−19	21	
10	North Lakes United	22	6	2	14	39	65	−26	20	
11	Ipswich Knights (R)	22	5	4	13	41	60	−19	19	Relegation to 2025 FQPL 3
12	Bayside United (R)	22	3	1	18	27	77	−50	10	Relegation to 2025 FQPL 3

Source: squadi
Rules for classification: 1) points; 2) goal difference; 3) number of goals scored; 4) head to head record.
(C) Champions; (R) Relegated

==== Results ====
Home \ Away	BAY	GRA	HPH	IPK	MAG	MAR	NLU	NOR	PIN	SAM	SOU	TAR
Bayside United		0–2	0–4	4–3	0–1	1–2	3–2	1–3	2–3	4–4	0–2	2–1
Grange Thistle	4–2		1–2	2–1	1–3	5–0	3–0	4–3	3–2	2–2	8–0	3–1
Holland Park Hawks	6–0	2–2		5–2	3–1	2–1	3–0	2–2	1–1	3–2	3–2	4–2
Ipswich Knights	4–1	1–1	0–4		1–2	0–6	2–1	0–4	4–5	1–5	1–2	2–2
Magic United	2–0	6–0	2–3	5–0		4–3	3–1	2–1	1–2	4–1	3–2	4–2
Maroochydore FC	6–1	2–2	2–5	2–2	3–6		2–2	0–2	5–3	1–2	5–4	7–1
North Lakes United	4–1	2–1	1–6	4–2	1–7	1–3		2–4	4–2	0–4	7–3	2–5
North Star	3–0	3–3	2–4	1–0	1–4	5–2	4–0		1–2	1–0	2–3	1–0
Pine Hills	5–0	2–3	0–1	1–3	2–1	1–0	0–1	3–0		4–3	6–1	1–3
Samford Rangers	7–2	3–3	2–1	2–4	2–3	5–4	3–1	1–2	0–1		3–3	2–1
Souths United	3–2	3–3	0–1	2–1	0–3	3–1	0–4	0–1	2–1	5–3		1–2
Taringa Rovers	6–1	0–4	3–4	4–4	2–9	2–4	3–3	1–2	0–2	3–2	3–2	

Source: squadi
Legend: Blue = home team win; Yellow = draw; Red = away team win.

==== Finals ====
Semifinals
1	Holland Park Hawks	1
4	Grange Thistle	0
2	Magic United	4
3	North Star	2

Grand final
1	Holland Park Hawks	2
2	Magic United	3

=== 2024 Kappa Pro Series ===
Group A

Pos	Team	Pld	W	D	L	GF	GA	GD	Pts	
1	Moreton City Excelsior (A)	5	5	0	0	15	3	+12	15	Advanced to the Quarter Finals
2	Wynnum Wolves (A)	5	2	2	1	10	6	+4	8	Advanced to the Quarter Finals
3	Rochedale Rovers	5	2	1	2	15	10	+5	7	
4	Logan Lightning	5	2	0	3	4	10	−6	6	
5	Broadbeach United	5	1	1	3	7	11	−4	4	
6	Southside Eagles	5	1	0	4	7	18	−11	3	

(A) Advance to a further round

Group B

Pos	Team	Pld	W	D	L	GF	GA	GD	Pts	
1	Gold Coast Knights (A)	5	5	0	0	27	6	+21	15	Advanced to the Quarter Finals
2	Sunshine Coast Wanderers (A)	5	3	0	2	14	11	+3	9	Advanced to the Quarter Finals
3	Brisbane Strikers	5	3	0	2	13	12	+1	9	
4	St George Willawong	5	2	0	3	13	14	−1	6	
5	Brisbane Roar Youth	5	2	0	3	10	23	−13	6	
6	SWQ Thunder	5	0	0	5	3	14	−11	0	

(A) Advance to a further round

Group C

Pos	Team	Pld	W	D	L	GF	GA	GD	Pts	
1	Brisbane City (A)	5	4	1	0	28	2	+26	13	Advanced to the Quarter Finals
2	Peninsula Power (A)	5	4	1	0	24	3	+21	13	Advanced to the Quarter Finals
3	Olympic FC	5	2	1	2	13	10	+3	7	
4	Capalaba FC	5	1	2	2	10	27	−17	5	
5	Mitchelton	5	1	1	3	5	22	−17	4	
6	Ipswich FC	5	0	0	5	3	19	−16	0	

(A) Advance to a further round

Group D

Pos	Team	Pld	W	D	L	GF	GA	GD	Pts	
1	Lions FC (A)	5	5	0	0	25	6	+19	15	Advanced to the Quarter Finals
2	Gold Coast United (A)	5	4	0	1	17	4	+13	12	Advanced to the Quarter Finals
3	Caboolture Sports	5	2	1	2	10	18	−8	7	
4	Redlands United	5	2	0	3	9	9	0	6	
5	Moreton City Excelsior	5	1	1	3	9	21	−12	4	
6	Eastern Suburbs	5	0	0	5	7	19	−12	0	

(A) Advance to a further round

Knockout Stage

Quarterfinals
Gold Coast Knights	3
Wynnum Wolves	1
Lions FC	2
Peninsula Power	1
Moreton City Excelsior	1
Sunshine Coast Wanderers	0
Brisbane City	1
Gold Coast United	2

Semifinals
Gold Coast Knights	2
Lions FC	4
Moreton City Excelsior	1
Gold Coast United	4

Finals
Lions FC	3
Gold Coast United	2

== Women's League Tables ==
=== 2024 Women's National Premier Leagues Queensland ===
Women's NPL Queensland
- Season: 2024
- Dates: 9 February-6 September
- Champions: Brisbane City
- Premiers: Brisbane City
- Relegated: Olympic FC; Peninsula Power
- Matches: 57
- Goals: 234 (4.11 per match)

The 2024 Women's National Premier Leagues Queensland season was the tenth season of women's first division football in Queensland under the National Premier Leagues banner. The season ran from 9 February to 6 September, as a triple round-robin over 27 rounds, followed by a finals series.

==== League table ====
Pos	Team	Pld	W	D	L	GF	GA	GD	Pts	Qualification or relegation
1	Brisbane City (C)	27	20	1	6	81	28	+53	61	Qualification for Finals
2	Eastern Suburbs	27	18	4	5	74	27	+47	58	Qualification for Finals
3	Lions FC	27	15	3	9	70	48	+22	48	Qualification for Finals
4	Souths United	27	13	4	10	62	54	+8	43	Qualification for Finals
5	Gold Coast United	27	10	6	11	45	43	+2	36	
6	Sunshine Coast Wanderers	27	9	9	9	33	44	−11	36	
7	Mitchelton	27	11	3	13	54	67	−13	36	
8	Peninsula Power (R)	27	8	7	12	55	64	−9	31	Relegation to 2025 FQPL 1 Women
9	Olympic FC (R)	27	4	8	15	29	68	−39	20	Relegation to 2025 FQPL 1 Women
10	FQ Academy QAS	27	4	1	22	30	90	−60	13	

Source: squadi
Rules for classification: 1) points; 2) goal difference; 3) number of goals scored; 4) head to head record.
(C) Champions; (R) Relegated

==== Results ====
Home \ Away	BCI	EAS	QAS	GCU	LIO	MIT	OLY	PEN	SOU	SCW	BCI	EAS	QAS	GCU	LIO	MIT	OLY	PEN	SOU	SCW
Brisbane City		3–3	3–0	1–0	1–2	2–0	4–2	4–0	3–1	4–0			2–1	1–0			8–1	0–1		
Eastern Suburbs	2–0		6–1	1–0	3–0	3–2	5–1	4–2	3–0	3–0	3–0				0–2	1–2			2–2	
FQ Academy QAS	2–1	0–4		1–4	0–5	4–1	2–0	2–8	2–3	0–4		0–5			3–2	1–5			1–2	0–2
Gold Coast United	0–3	2–3	4–0		2–3	0–2	0–0	2–0	2–4	2–2		0–6	2–1				2–0	2–2		
Lions FC	2–3	4–2	2–0	3–4		3–1	4–0	4–3	2–2	4–0	0–6			2–0			3–0	1–2		0–1
Mitchelton	1–4	2–1	3–0	1–3	4–4		2–0	4–4	2–7	2–0	0–3			2–1	1–7					
Olympic FC	1–6	0–2	6–4	0–3	3–3	2–3		1–1	0–5	1–0		0–1	1–1			1–1			3–4	1–1
Peninsula Power	1–4	0–3	3–0	4–4	0–3	3–5	0–1		0–2	3–1		1–6	4–1			4–1	1–1			
Souths United	0–3	2–1	5–2	0–3	2–0	1–5	1–2	4–2		2–0	2–3			1–1	4–5	3–1		0–2		1–2
Sunshine Coast Wanderers	1–8	0–0	3–1	0–2	1–0	4–1	1–1	2–2	2–2		2–1	1–1		0–0		1–0		2–2		

Source: squadi
Legend: Blue = home team win; Yellow = draw; Red = away team win.

==== Finals ====
Semifinals
1	Brisbane City	3
4	Souths United	0
2	Eastern Suburbs	1
3	Lions FC	2

Grand final
1	Brisbane City	2
3	Lions FC	1

=== 2024 Women's Football Queensland Premier League 1 ===
Women's Football Queensland Premier League 1
- Season: 2024
- Dates: 16 March-6 September
- Matches: 19
- Goals: 114 (6 per match)

The 2024 Women's Football Queensland Premier League 1 season was the second division of women's football in Queensland in 2024. The season ran from 16 March to 6 September, as a double round-robin over 18 rounds, followed by a finals series.

==== League table ====
Pos	Team	Pld	W	D	L	GF	GA	GD	Pts	Qualification or relegation
1	Gold Coast Knights (C)	18	17	1	0	102	10	+92	52	Promotion to 2025 Women's NPL Queensland and qualification for Finals
2	North Lakes United	18	14	2	2	80	21	+59	44	Promotion to 2025 Women's NPL Queensland and qualification for Finals
3	Robina City	18	9	4	5	49	34	+15	31	Qualification for Finals
4	Capalaba FC	18	10	1	7	42	36	+6	31	Qualification for Finals
5	Logan Lightning	18	9	2	7	54	40	+14	29	
6	Virginia United	18	6	5	7	49	44	+5	23	
7	Broadbeach United	18	6	2	10	27	60	−33	20	
8	Moreton Bay Excelsior	18	4	2	12	31	66	−35	14	
9	SWQ Thunder (R)	18	3	3	12	22	56	−34	12	Relegation to 2025 Women's FQPL 2
10	Ipswich Knights (R)	18	1	0	17	17	106	−89	3	Relegation to 2025 Women's FQPL 2

Source: squadi
Rules for classification: 1) points; 2) goal difference; 3) number of goals scored; 4) head to head record.
(C) Champions; (R) Relegated

==== Results ====
Home \ Away	BRO	CAP	GCK	IPK	LOG	MOR	NLU	ROB	THU	VIR
Broadbeach United		1–3	0–6	4–0	0–4	4–3	0–7	0–3	4–1	2–2
Capalaba FC	5–1		1–3	6–2	0–3	4–0	2–0	0–4	3–3	1–2
Gold Coast Knights	8–0	5–0		10–3	6–0	4–0	3–0	4–0	11–0	4–0
Ipswich Knights	2–5	0–2	0–12		1–8	3–5	1–7	0–3	2–1	0–4
Logan Lightning	9–0	1–2	2–8	FW		4–0	1–1	3–1	1–1	2–1
Moreton Bay Excelsior	1–2	2–5	0–3	8–1	1–6		1–7	0–1	1–0	2–2
North Lakes United	2–1	5–3	1–1	11–0	6–2	10–1		6–2	6–0	1–0
Robina City	1–1	2–1	1–4	8–1	3–0	5–0	2–3		2–2	6–6
SWQ Thunder	1–2	1–2	0–4	1–0	4–3	1–2	0–3	1–3		2–1
Virginia United	2–0	1–2	2–6	8–1	5–2	4–4	1–4	2–2	6–3	

Source: squadi
Legend: Blue = home team win; Yellow = draw; Red = away team win.

==== Finals ====
Semifinals
1	Gold Coast Knights	2
4	Capalaba FC	0
2	North Lakes United	6
3	Robina City	0

Grand final
1	Gold Coast Knights	4
2	North Lakes United	0

=== 2024 Women's Football Queensland Premier League 2 ===
Women's Football Queensland Premier League 2
- Season: 2024
- Dates: 16 March-13 September
- Matches: 20
- Goals: 55 (2.75 per match)

The 2024 Women's Football Queensland Premier League 2 season is the third division of women's football in Queensland in 2024.The season ran from 16 March to 13 September, as a double round-robin over 18 rounds, followed by a finals series.

==== League table ====
Pos	Team	Pld	W	D	L	GF	GA	GD	Pts	Qualification or relegation
1	Grange Thistle	18	13	4	1	37	10	+27	43	Promotion to 2025 Women's FQPL 1 and qualification for Finals
2	Caboolture Sports (C)	18	13	2	3	34	15	+19	41	Promotion to 2025 Women's FQPL 1 and qualification for Finals
3	North Brisbane	18	12	2	4	37	13	+24	38	Promotion to 2025 Women's FQPL 1 and qualification for Finals
4	Samford Rangers	18	9	1	8	35	32	+3	28	Qualification for Finals
5	Annerley FC	18	7	4	7	39	27	+12	25	
6	University of Queensland FC	18	6	4	8	18	21	−3	22	
7	The Gap	18	5	6	7	29	30	−1	21	
8	Mt Gravatt Hawks	18	6	1	11	23	40	−17	19	
9	Pine Hills	18	2	3	13	7	35	−28	9	
10	Springfield United (R)	18	2	3	13	9	45	−36	9	Relegation to 2025 Women's FQPL 3

Source: squadi
Rules for classification: 1) points; 2) goal difference; 3) number of goals scored; 4) head to head record.
(C) Champions; (R) Relegated

==== Results ====
Home \ Away	ANN	CAB	GRA	MGH	NBR	PIN	SAM	SPR	GAP	UQ
Annerley FC		1–3	1–2	6–3	0–3	1–0	5–0	0–1	3–3	2–1
Caboolture Sports	2–1		1–1	3–0	3–1	1–1	5–0	2–0	4–1	1–0
Grange Thistle	2–1	6–1		4–2	0–2	2–0	2–0	2–0	3–0	4–0
Mt Gravatt Hawks	1–2	1–0	0–2		0–2	0–1	3–2	1–0	2–2	1–3
North Brisbane	1–1	0–2	2–3	4–1		0–0	2–0	6–0	2–1	1–0
Pine Hills	0–8	0–1	0–3	1–2	0–1		2–5	0–0	0–2	0–0
Samford Rangers	1–1	1–0	0–1	4–2	2–0	1–0		3–0	4–2	1–3
Springfield United	2–5	0–2	0–0	1–3	0–4	2–0	1–6		2–2	0–2
The Gap	1–1	0–1	0–0	3–0	0–3	1–2	2–1	5–0		0–0
University of Queensland FC	1–0	1–2	0–0	0–1	0–0	2–0	1–4	2–0	2–4	

Source: squadi
Legend: Blue = home team win; Yellow = draw; Red = away team win.

==== Finals ====
Semifinals
1	Grange Thistle	3
4	Samford Rangers	0
2	Caboolture Sports	2
3	North Brisbane	1

Grand final
1	Grange Thistle	1
2	Caboolture Sports	2

=== 2024 Kappa Pro Series ===
Group A

Pos	Team	Pld	W	D	L	GF	GA	GD	Pts	
1	North Lakes United (A)	3	2	1	0	16	4	+12	7	Advanced to the Quarter Finals
2	Capalaba FC (A)	3	2	1	0	11	2	+9	7	Advanced to the Quarter Finals
3	The Gap	3	1	0	2	6	14	−8	3	
4	North Brisbane	3	0	0	3	2	15	−13	0	

(A) Advance to a further round

Group B

Pos	Team	Pld	W	D	L	GF	GA	GD	Pts	
1	Logan Lightning (A)	3	3	0	0	17	5	+12	9	Advanced to the Quarter Finals
2	Ipswich Knights (A)	3	2	0	1	17	9	+8	6	Advanced to the Quarter Finals
3	Mt Gravatt Hawks	3	1	0	2	6	6	0	3	
4	Pine Hills	3	0	0	3	4	24	−20	0	

(A) Advance to a further round

Group C

Pos	Team	Pld	W	D	L	GF	GA	GD	Pts	
1	SWQ Thunder (A)	3	3	0	0	13	3	+10	9	Advanced to the Quarter Finals
2	Samford Rangers	3	1	1	1	6	7	−1	4	
3	Moreton City Excelsior	3	1	1	1	3	5	−2	4	
4	University of Queensland FC	3	0	0	3	2	9	−7	0	

(A) Advance to a further round

Group D

Pos	Team	Pld	W	D	L	GF	GA	GD	Pts	
1	Gold Coast Knights (A)	3	3	0	0	22	2	+20	9	Advanced to the Quarter Finals
2	Virginia United (A)	3	2	0	1	10	6	+4	6	Advanced to the Quarter Finals
3	Caboolture Sports	3	1	0	2	5	11	−6	3	
4	Annerley FC	3	0	0	3	2	20	−18	0	

(A) Advance to a further round

Group E

Pos	Team	Pld	W	D	L	GF	GA	GD	Pts	
1	Grange Thistle (A)	3	2	1	0	8	2	+6	7	Advanced to the Quarter Finals
2	Broadbeach United	3	2	0	1	6	6	0	6	
3	Robina City	3	1	1	1	7	2	+5	4	
4	Springfield United	3	0	0	3	1	12	−11	0	

(A) Advance to a further round

Knockout Stage

Quarterfinals
Logan Lightning	9
Ipswich Knights	2
SWQ Thunder	2
Capalaba FC	3
Gold Coast Knights	13
Grange Thistle	0
North Lakes United	3
Virginia United	1

Semifinals
Logan Lightning (a.e.t.)	4
Capalaba FC	2
Gold Coast Knights	8
North Lakes United	0

Finals
Logan Lightning	0
Gold Coast Knights	2
