= 2017 in Queensland soccer =

Football Queensland
- Season: 2017

The 2017 Football Queensland season was the fifth season since NPL Queensland commenced as the top tier of Queensland men’s football. Below NPL Queensland was a regional structure of ten zones with their own leagues. The strongest of the zones was Football Brisbane with its senior men’s competition consisting of five divisions.

The NPL Queensland premiers qualified for the National Premier Leagues finals series, competing with the other state federation champions in a final knockout tournament to decide the National Premier Leagues Champion for 2017.

On 8 December 2016 Football Queensland announced the commencement in 2018 of a 14 team second competition beneath a 14 team NPL Queensland, with promotion and relegation between the two tiers. The 28 clubs selected to participate in NPL Queensland and the FQPL were initially announced on 29 May 2017. The final list of clubs offered licences was made of 3 August 2017, with 12 clubs from Football Brisbane competitions (10 BPL and 2 CL1) to join the Football Queensland leagues in 2018. As a result, on 4 August 2017 Football Brisbane announced the restructure of its men's league for the 2018 season, with most clubs effectively moving up one division.

== Men's League Tables ==
=== 2017 National Premier League Queensland ===
NPL Queensland
- Season: 2017
- Champions: Western Pride
- Premiers: Brisbane Strikers
- Matches: 132
- Goals: 538 (4.08 per match)
- Top goalscorer: Sam Smith (22 goals)
- Biggest home win: Brisbane Strikers 9-0 Sunshine Coast (4 April 2017); Gold Coast City 9-0 Sunshine Coast (17 June 2017)
- Biggest away win: Sunshine Coast 0-7 Moreton Bay (30 April 2017)
- Highest scoring: Western Pride 9-3 Sunshine Coast (22 April 2017)

The National Premier League Queensland 2017 season was played over 22 matches, followed by a finals series.

Pos	Team	Pld	W	D	L	GF	GA	GD	Pts	Qualification or relegation
1	Brisbane Strikers	22	16	3	3	68	21	+47	51	2017 National Premier Leagues Finals
2	Gold Coast City	22	15	3	4	59	25	+34	48	2017 NPL Queensland Finals
3	Western Pride (C)	22	12	5	5	73	27	+46	41	2017 NPL Queensland Finals
4	Moreton Bay United	22	12	5	5	49	27	+22	41	2017 NPL Queensland Finals
5	Olympic FC	22	12	4	6	57	27	+30	40	
6	Brisbane City	22	12	1	9	51	32	+19	37	
7	Far North Queensland	22	9	4	9	38	37	+1	31	
8	Northern Fury	22	7	4	11	36	55	−19	25	
9	Redlands United	22	6	4	12	30	53	−23	22	
10	South West Queensland Thunder	22	6	2	14	30	53	−23	20	
11	Brisbane Roar Youth	22	5	3	14	33	66	−33	18	
12	Sunshine Coast	22	0	2	20	18	117	−99	2	

Source: sportstg.com
Rules for classification: 1) points; 2) goal difference; 3) number of goals scored.
(C) Champions

==== Finals ====
Semi-finals
1	Brisbane Strikers	1
4	Moreton Bay United	3
2	Gold Coast City	0
3	Western Pride	3

Grand Final
3	Western Pride	2
4	Moreton Bay United	1

=== 2017 Brisbane Premier League ===
Brisbane Premier League
- Season: 2017
- Champions: Lions FC
- Premiers: Rochedale Rovers
- Relegated: No relegation
- Matches: 132
- Goals: 527 (3.99 per match)
- Top goalscorer: Tynan Diaz (21 goals)
- Biggest home win: Holland Park Hawks 8-0 Capalaba (19 February 2017)
- Biggest away win: Capalaba 0-7 Lions FC (26 February 2017)
- Highest scoring: Capalaba 3-7 Holland Park Hawks (20 May 2017)

The 2017 Brisbane Premier League was the 35th edition of the Brisbane Premier League which has been a second level domestic association football competition in Queensland since the Queensland State League was formed in 2008.

Pos	Team	Pld	W	D	L	GF	GA	GD	Pts	Qualification or relegation
1	Rochedale Rovers (P)	22	13	6	3	50	28	+22	45	Promoted to 2018 FQPL; 2017 BPL Finals
2	Peninsula Power (P)	22	13	4	5	47	31	+16	43	Promoted to 2018 FQPL; 2017 BPL Finals
3	Lions FC (C, P)	22	13	3	6	65	29	+36	42	Promoted to 2018 NPL Queensland; 2017 BPL Finals
4	Mitchelton (P)	22	9	5	8	47	41	+6	32	Promoted to 2018 FQPL; 2017 BPL Finals
5	Albany Creek	22	9	5	8	42	38	+4	32	
6	Eastern Suburbs (P)	22	8	7	7	41	31	+10	31	Promoted to 2018 FQPL
7	Holland Park (P)	22	8	6	8	56	45	+11	30	Promoted to 2018 FQPL
8	Souths United (P)	22	8	5	9	45	41	+4	29	Promoted to 2018 FQPL
9	Ipswich Knights (P)	22	7	6	9	27	54	−27	27	Promoted to 2018 FQPL
10	Grange Thistle	22	6	4	12	37	57	−20	22	
11	Logan Lightning (P)	22	6	2	14	38	57	−19	20	Promoted to 2018 FQPL
12	Capalaba (P)	22	4	3	15	32	75	−43	15	Promoted to 2018 FQPL

Source: sportstg.com
Rules for classification: 1) points; 2) goal difference; 3) number of goals scored.
(C) Champions; (P) Promoted

==== Finals ====
Semi-finals
1	Rochedale Rovers	0
2	Peninsula Power	5
3	Lions FC	3
4	Mitchelton	0

Preliminary Final
1	Rochedale Rovers	1
3	Lions FC	2

Grand Final
2	Peninsula Power	0
3	Lions FC	1

=== 2017 Capital League 1 ===
Capital League 1
- Season: 2017
- Champions: Taringa Rovers
- Premiers: Taringa Rovers
- Relegated: North Star, Moggill
- Matches: 132
- Goals: 546 (4.14 per match)
- Top goalscorer: Shuto Kuboyama (24 goals)
- Biggest home win: North Pine 10-2 Moggill (20 May 2017); Bayside United 8-0 Moggill (12 August 2017)
- Biggest away win: Moggill 1-11 Taringa Rovers (19 August 2017)
- Highest scoring: North Pine 10-2 Moggill (20 May 2017); Moggill 1-11 Taringa Rovers (19 August 2017)

The 2017 Capital League 1 season was the fifth edition of the Capital League 1 as the third level domestic football competition in Queensland. 12 teams competed, all playing each other twice for a total of 22 matches. Relegated teams will be part of the 2018 Capital League 1 season, which will be the fourth level domestic competition in Queensland.

Pos	Team	Pld	W	D	L	GF	GA	GD	Pts	Qualification or relegation
1	Taringa Rovers (C, P)	22	16	3	3	63	19	+44	51	Promoted to 2018 Brisbane Premier League; 2017 CL1 Finals
2	North Pine (P)	22	14	3	5	65	38	+27	45	Promoted to 2018 Brisbane Premier League; 2017 CL1 Finals
3	Brisbane Knights (P)	22	12	3	7	57	48	+9	39	Promoted to 2018 Brisbane Premier League; 2017 CL1 Finals
4	Wolves FC (P)	22	12	2	8	53	38	+15	38	Promoted to 2018 FQPL; 2017 CL1 Finals
5	Acacia Ridge (P)	22	11	1	10	40	33	+7	34	Promoted to 2018 Brisbane Premier League
6	Bayside United (P)	22	10	4	8	40	35	+5	34	Promoted to 2018 Brisbane Premier League
7	Southside Eagles (P)	22	9	6	7	51	33	+18	33	Promoted to 2018 FQPL
8	The Gap (P)	22	10	2	10	39	48	−9	32	Promoted to 2018 Brisbane Premier League
9	UQ FC (P)	22	8	3	11	41	39	+2	27	Promoted to 2018 Brisbane Premier League
10	Mount Gravatt (P)	22	6	5	11	34	44	−10	23	Promoted to 2018 Brisbane Premier League
11	North Star	22	6	4	12	44	47	−3	22	
12	Moggill	22	0	0	22	19	124	−105	0	

Source: sportstg.com
Rules for classification: 1) points; 2) goal difference; 3) number of goals scored.
(C) Champions; (P) Promoted

==== Finals ====
Semi-finals
1	Taringa Rovers	1
2	North Pine	0
3	Brisbane Knights	6
4	Wolves FC	2

Preliminary Final
2	North Pine	1 (5)
3	Brisbane Knights	1 (4)

Grand Final
1	Taringa Rovers (a.e.t.)	3
2	North Pine	2

=== 2017 Capital League 2 ===
Capital League 2
- Season: 2017
- Champions: Virginia United
- Premiers: Centenary Stormers
- Relegated: Pine Rivers United, Park Ridge
- Matches: 132
- Goals: 590 (4.47 per match)
- Top goalscorer: James Gorrie (35 goals)
- Biggest home win: Centenary Stormers 9-0 Park Ridge (10 March 2017); Western Spirit 9-0 Pine Rivers United (18 March 2017); Annerley 9-0 Park Ridge (3 June 2017)
- Biggest away win: Park Ridge 1-11 Ipswich City (17 February 2017)
- Highest scoring: Park Ridge 1-11 Ipswich City (17 February 2017)

The 2017 Capital League 2 season was the fifth edition of the Capital League 2 as the fourth level domestic football competition in Queensland. 12 teams competed, all playing each other twice for a total of 22 matches. Relegated teams will be part of the 2018 Capital League 2 season, which will be the fifth level domestic competition in Queensland.

Pos	Team	Pld	W	D	L	GF	GA	GD	Pts	Qualification or relegation
1	Centenary Stormers (P)	22	18	2	2	77	26	+51	56	Promoted to 2018 Brisbane Premier League; 2017 CL2 Finals
2	Virginia United (C, P)	22	17	1	4	66	19	+47	52	Promoted to 2018 Brisbane Premier League; 2017 CL2 Finals
3	Ipswich City (P)	22	15	1	6	83	32	+51	46	Promoted to 2018 Capital League 1; 2017 CL2 Finals
4	Annerley (P)	22	15	0	7	70	33	+37	45	Promoted to 2018 Capital League 1; 2017 CL2 Finals
5	Toowong (P)	22	11	3	8	40	41	−1	36	Promoted to 2018 Capital League 1
6	Brisbane Force (P)	22	11	2	9	55	39	+16	35	Promoted to 2018 Capital League 1
7	Western Spirit (P)	22	10	3	9	56	39	+17	33	Promoted to 2018 Capital League 1
8	New Farm United (P)	22	9	4	9	41	47	−6	31	Promoted to 2018 Capital League 1
9	Pine Hills (P)	22	7	1	14	35	54	−19	22	Promoted to 2018 Capital League 1
10	Oxley United (P)	22	6	3	13	30	52	−22	21	Promoted to 2018 Capital League 1
11	Pine Rivers United	22	2	1	19	22	96	−74	7	
12	Park Ridge	22	0	1	21	15	112	−97	1	

Source: sportstg.com
Rules for classification: 1) points; 2) goal difference; 3) number of goals scored.
(C) Champions; (P) Promoted

==== Finals ====
Semi-finals
1	Centenary Stormers	2
2	Virginia United	1
3	Ipswich City	1
4	Annerley	3

Preliminary Final
2	Virginia United	2
4	Annerley	0

Grand Final
1	Centenary Stormers	1
2	Virginia United	2

=== 2017 Capital League 3 ===
Capital League 3
- Season: 2017
- Champions: Caboolture Sports
- Premiers: St. George Willawong
- Relegated: Narangba United, Jimboomba United
- Matches: 132
- Goals: 565 (4.28 per match)
- Top goalscorer: James Fairgrieve (27 goals)
- Biggest home win: St. George Willawong 8-1 Caboolture Sports (19 February 2017); Caboolture Sports 9-2 Clairvaux (17 June 2017); Tarragindi Tigers 7-0 Jimboomba United (24 June 2017)
- Biggest away win: Jimboomba United 0-9 Caboolture Sports (29 July 2017)
- Highest scoring: Caboolture Sports 8-3 Jimboomba United (22 April 2017); Caboolture Sports 9-2 Clairvaux (17 June 2017)

The 2017 Capital League 3 season was the fifth edition of the Capital League 3 as the fifth level domestic football competition in Queensland. 12 teams competed, all playing each other twice for a total of 22 matches. Relegated teams will be part of the 2018 Capital League 3 season, which will be the sixth level domestic competition in Queensland.

Pos	Team	Pld	W	D	L	GF	GA	GD	Pts	Qualification or relegation
1	St. George Willawong (P)	22	18	1	3	80	26	+54	55	Promoted to 2018 Capital League 1; 2017 CL3 Finals
2	Caboolture Sports (C, P)	22	15	2	5	85	42	+43	47	Promoted to 2018 Capital League 1; 2017 CL3 Finals
3	AC Carina (P)	22	15	0	7	48	26	+22	45	Promoted to 2018 Capital League 2; 2017 CL3 Finals
4	Westside (P)	22	12	4	6	44	34	+10	40	Promoted to 2018 Capital League 2; 2017 CL3 Finals
5	Bardon Latrobe (P)	22	11	2	9	58	48	+10	35	Promoted to 2018 Capital League 2
6	Newmarket (P)	22	9	4	9	31	41	−10	31	Promoted to 2018 Capital League 2
7	Redcliffe PCYC (P)	22	8	5	9	40	47	−7	29	Promoted to 2018 Capital League 2
8	Tarragindi Tigers (P)	22	7	3	12	42	46	−4	24	Promoted to 2018 Capital League 2
9	Slacks Creek (P)	22	7	4	11	42	61	−19	25	Promoted to 2018 Capital League 2
10	Clairvaux (P)	22	7	1	14	35	57	−22	22	Promoted to 2018 Capital League 2
11	Narangba United	22	6	2	14	33	51	−18	20	
12	Jimboomba United	22	1	4	17	27	86	−59	7	

Source: sportstg.com
Rules for classification: 1) points; 2) goal difference; 3) number of goals scored.
(C) Champions; (P) Promoted

==== Finals ====
Semi-finals
1	St. George Willawong	1
2	Caboolture Sports	5
3	AC Carina	3
4	Westside	2

Preliminary Final
1	St. George Willawong	1
3	AC Carina	2

Grand Final
2	Caboolture Sports (a.e.t.)	4
3	AC Carina	3

=== 2017 Capital League 4 ===
Capital League 4
- Season: 2017
- Champions: Kangaroo Point Rovers
- Premiers: Samford Rangers
- Promoted: Samford Rangers, North Brisbane
- Matches: 72
- Goals: 341 (4.74 per match)
- Top goalscorer: Dane Forsyth (29 goals)
- Biggest home win: Logan Metro 15-4 The Lakes (29 July 2017)
- Biggest away win: The Lakes 1-10 Samford Rangers (9 July 2017); The Lakes 1-10 North Brisbane (2 July 2017)
- Highest scoring: Logan Metro 15-4 The Lakes (29 July 2017)

The 2017 Capital League 4 season was the fifth edition of the Capital League 4 as the sixth level domestic football competition in Queensland. Nine teams competed, all playing each other twice for a total of 16 matches.

Pos	Team	Pld	W	D	L	GF	GA	GD	Pts	Qualification or relegation
1	Samford Rangers (P)	16	13	2	1	75	14	+61	41	Promoted to 2018 Capital League 2; 2017 CL4 Finals
2	North Brisbane (P)	16	12	1	3	49	12	+37	37	Promoted to 2018 Capital League 2; 2017 CL4 Finals
3	Kangaroo Point Rovers (C, P)	16	12	1	3	39	13	+26	37	Promoted to 2018 Capital League 3; 2017 CL4 Finals
4	Bethania Rams (P)	16	10	1	5	34	22	+12	31	Promoted to 2018 Capital League 3; 2017 CL4 Finals
5	Springfield United (P)	16	7	1	8	38	37	+1	22	Promoted to 2018 Capital League 3
6	Logan Metro (P)	16	6	3	7	45	38	+7	21	Promoted to 2018 Capital League 3
7	Mooroondu (P)	16	2	1	13	15	60	−45	7	Promoted to 2018 Capital League 3
8	The Lakes (P)	16	2	1	13	29	78	−49	7	Promoted to 2018 Capital League 3
9	Logan Village (P)	16	2	1	13	17	67	−50	7	Promoted to 2018 Capital League 3

Source: sportstg.com
Rules for classification: 1) points; 2) goal difference; 3) number of goals scored.
(C) Champions; (P) Promoted

==== Finals ====
Semi-finals
1	Samford Rangers	7
2	North Brisbane	0
3	Kangaroo Point Rovers	2
4	Bethania Rams	1

Preliminary Final
2	North Brisbane	0
3	Kangaroo Point Rovers	1

Grand Final
1	Samford Rangers	0
3	Kangaroo Point Rovers	2

== Women's League Tables ==
=== 2017 Women's NPL Queensland ===
Women's NPL Queensland
- Season: 2017
- Champions: Peninsula Power
- Premiers: Peninsula Power
- Matches: 89
- Goals: 446 (5.01 per match)
- Top goalscorer: Brooke Barbuto (28 goals)
- Biggest home win: Peninsula Power 11-1 SW Qld Thunder (7 May 2017); Peninsula Power 10-0 Gold Coast City (30 July 2017)
- Biggest away win: SW Qld Thunder 0-11 Peninsula Power (22 July 2017)
- Highest scoring: Peninsula Power 11-1 SW Qld Thunder (7 May 2017)

The 2017 Women's NPL Queensland season was the third edition of the Women's NPL Queensland as the top level domestic football of women's competition in Queensland. 10 teams competed, all playing each other twice for a total of 18 matches.

Pos	Team	Pld	W	D	L	GF	GA	GD	Pts	Qualification or relegation
1	Peninsula Power (C)	18	17	1	0	103	11	+92	52	2017 Women's NPL Qld Finals
2	The Gap	18	15	0	3	81	13	+68	45	2017 Women's NPL Qld Finals
3	Souths United	18	13	2	3	51	16	+35	41	2017 Women's NPL Qld Finals
4	UQ FC	18	10	3	5	45	24	+21	33	2017 Women's NPL Qld Finals
5	Eastern Suburbs	18	9	3	6	51	42	+9	30	
6	South West Queensland Thunder	18	7	0	11	44	82	−38	21	
7	Gold Coast City	17	6	0	11	28	51	−23	18	
8	Olympic FC	17	5	1	11	19	50	−31	16	
9	Western Pride	18	1	0	17	13	78	−65	3	
10	Sunshine Coast	18	1	0	17	11	79	−68	3	

Source: sportstg.com
Rules for classification: 1) points; 2) goal difference; 3) number of goals scored.
(C) Champions

==== Finals ====
Semi-finals
1	Peninsula Power	2
4	UQ FC	1
2	The Gap	2
3	Souths United	0

Grand Final
1	Peninsula Power	2
2	The Gap	1

== Cup Competitions ==
=== 2017 Canale Cup ===
Brisbane-based soccer clubs competed in 2017 for the Canale Cup, known for sponsorship reasons as the 2017 Pig 'N' Whistle Canale Cup. Clubs entered from the Brisbane Premier League, the Capital League 1, Capital League 2 and Capital League 3. The early rounds of the competition were linked to the qualifying competition for the 2017 FFA Cup, where losing teams from successive rounds of the FFA Cup Preliminary rounds entered in following rounds of the Canale Cup.

This knockout competition was won by Peninsula Power.

=== FFA Cup qualifiers ===
Queensland-based soccer clubs competed in 2017 in the preliminary rounds for the 2017 FFA Cup. The four winners of the seventh round qualified for the final rounds of the FFA Cup; Far North Queensland FC (representing North Queensland), Gold Coast City (representing South Queensland), with Moreton Bay United and Peninsula Power representing Brisbane. In addition, A-League club Brisbane Roar qualified for the final rounds, entering at the Round of 32.
