= List of Gold Coast United F.C. seasons =

Gold Coast United Football Club is an Australian semi-professional association football club based in Gold Coast, Queensland. The club was formed in 2008.

== Key ==
Key to league competitions:

- A-League – Australia's top football league, established in 2005
- National Premier Leagues Queensland (NPL Queensland)

Key to colours and symbols:

1st or W	Winners
2nd or RU	Runners-up
3rd	Third
↑	Promoted
↓	Relegated
♦	Top scorer in division

Key to league record:

- Season = The year and article of the season
- Pos = Final position
- Pld = Games played
- W = Games won
- D = Games drawn
- L = Games lost
- GF = Goals scored
- GA = Goals against
- Pts = Points

== Seasons ==
Results of league and cup competitions by season
Season	Division	P	W	D	L	F	A	Pts	Pos	Finals	Cup	Competition	Result	Name	Goals
Season	League										Cup	Other / Asia		Top goalscorer	
2009–10	A-League	27	13	5	9	39	35	44	3rd	5th	N/A	—	—	Shane Smeltz	19
2010–11	A-League	30	12	10	8	40	32	46	4th	3rd	N/A	—	—	Bruce Djite	10
2011–12	A-League	27	4	9	14	30	42	21	10th	—	N/A	—	—	James Brown	6
2018	NPL Queensland	26	8	3	15	38	67	27	10th	—	—	—	—	Unknown	Unknown
2019	NPL Queensland	28	11	4	13	46	49	37	7th	—	QR4	—	—	Brandon Reeves	15
2020	NPL Queensland	24	5	8	11	37	47	23	11th	—	N/A	—	—	Shane Smeltz	13
2021	NPL Queensland	17	6	2	9	26	24	20	10th	—	QR5	—	—	Sam Smith	9
2022	NPL Queensland	22	9	5	8	37	34	32	6th	—	QR6	—	—	Shane Smeltz	11
2023	NPL Queensland	22	10	6	6	27	23	36	3rd	EF	QR7	—	—	Curtis Stollery	9
2024	NPL Queensland	22	5	9	8	29	33	24	7th	—	QR7	—	—	Chris Lucas	10
2025	NPL Queensland	22	8	3	11	25	44	27	9th	—	QR6	—	—	Chris Lucas	5
2026	NPL Queensland	0	0	0	0	0	0	0	TBD	TBD	QR6	—	—	TBD	—
