= 2025 in Queensland soccer =

Football Queensland
- Season: 2025

The 2025 Football Queensland season was the 13th season since NPL Queensland commenced as the highest-ranking level of Queensland men's football. The 2025 season was also the eighth season of the Football Queensland Premier League and the fifth season of the Football Queensland Premier League 2, representing the second and third tiers of Queensland men's football respectively.

== Pre-season changes ==
2024 league	Promoted to league	Relegated from league
NPL QLD	St George Willawong; Eastern Suburbs	Rochedale Rovers; Redlands United
FQPL1	Holland Park Hawks; Magic United	Moreton City Excelsior Reserves; Mitchelton
FQPL2	Brisbane Knights; Robina City	Ipswich Knights; Bayside United
NPLW QLD	Gold Coast Knights; North Lakes United	Olympic FC; Peninsula Power
FQPLW1	Grange Thistle; Caboolture Sports; North Brisbane	Ipswich Knights; Broadbeach United; Robina City
FQPLW2	Holland Park Hawks; Palm Beach; Southside Eagles	Springfield United

== Men's League Tables ==
=== 2025 National Premier Leagues Queensland ===
NPL Queensland
- Season: 2025
- Dates: 21 February – 12 September
- Champions: Lions FC
- Premiers: Moreton City Excelsior
- Relegated: St George Willawong; Sunshine Coast Wanderers
- Top goalscorer: Andrew Pengelley (Lions FC) 16 goals

The 2025 National Premier Leagues Queensland season was the 13th season of first division football in Queensland under the National Premier Leagues banner. The regular season ran from 21 February to 26 August as a double round-robin over 22 rounds, followed by a finals series.

==== League table ====
Pos	Team	Pld	W	D	L	GF	GA	GD	Pts	Qualification or relegation
1	Moreton City Excelsior (Q)	22	14	5	3	48	23	+25	47	Qualification to Australian Championship and Finals series
2	Lions FC (C)	22	13	3	6	48	29	+19	42	Qualification to Finals series
3	Peninsula Power	22	11	6	5	45	21	+24	39	Qualification to Finals series
4	Eastern Suburbs	22	12	5	5	51	37	+14	38 (Note: Eastern Suburbs were deducted three points for breaches of administrative procedures.)	Qualification to Finals series
5	Gold Coast Knights	22	11	4	7	29	26	+3	37	
6	Olympic FC	22	9	3	10	29	26	+3	30	
7	Brisbane City	22	9	3	10	43	42	+1	30	
8	Wynnum Wolves	22	7	6	9	41	40	+1	27	
9	Gold Coast United	22	8	3	11	25	44	−19	27	
10	Brisbane Roar Youth	22	6	4	12	29	35	−6	22	
11	St George Willawong (R)	22	4	7	11	27	48	−21	19	Relegation to 2026 FQPL 1
12	Sunshine Coast Wanderers (R)	22	2	3	17	20	64	−44	9	Relegation to 2026 FQPL 1

Source: Squadi
Rules for classification: 1) points; 2) goal difference; 3) number of goals scored; 4) head to head record.
(C) Champions; (Q) Qualified for the phase indicated; (R) Relegated

==== Results ====
Home \ Away	BCY	BRI	EAS	GCK	GCU	LFC	MCE	OLY	PEN	SGW	SCW	WYN
Brisbane City			2–4	0–1	1–1	4–2	1–3	2–3	2–1	2–1	1–1	3–4
Brisbane Roar Youth	0–1		1–2	1–1	5–1	1–2	1–2	1–3	1–4	0–0	2–0	1–2
Eastern Suburbs	2–5	3–3		1–3	5–1	4–3	2–2	1–0	1–2	1–1	4–1	1–0
Gold Coast Knights	5–2	0–1	2–1		0–1	3–1	1–0	1–0	0–0	0–0	2–1	4–2
Gold Coast United	2–0	0–3	1–4	0–1		0–2	0–2	1–2	1–0	2–0	1–0	3–1
Lions	4–3	3–0	0–1	3–1	2–4		0–0	2–1	1–1	3–0	4–0	2–0
Moreton City Excelsior	4–3	1–1	2–0	4–0	3–0	3–1		2–0	3–3	2–5	3–0	1–1
Olympic	0–1	1–0	3–3	2–0	3–0	0–3	1–2		0–1	3–1	0–0	1–2
Peninsula Power	1–0	4–0	1–1	2–0	7–0	1–2	0–2	1–0		5–0	3–1	1–4
St George Willawong	1–4	0–3	0–1	2–2	1–1	0–3	3–1	2–4	1–1		3–2	1–4
Sunshine Coast Wanderers	1–4	2–1	1–5	2–0	1–3	1–1	0–5	0–2	0–5	2–3		2–6
Wynnum Wolves	0–0	1–2	2–4	0–2	2–2	1–4	0–1	0–0	1–1	2–2	6–2	

Updated to match(es) played on 23 August 2025. Source: Squadi
Legend: Blue = home team win; Yellow = draw; Red = away team win.

==== Finals ====
Semi-finals
1	Moreton City Excelsior	4
4	Eastern Suburbs	1
2	Lions FC	3
3	Peninsula Power	0

Grand final
Moreton City Excelsior	1
Lions FC	2

==== Top Scorers ====
Rank	Player	Team	Goals
1	Andrew Pengelley	Lions FC	16
2	Niyah Joseph	Peninsula Power	15
3	Seita Murai	Moreton City Excelsior	13
4	Marquez Walters	Gold Coast Knights	11
4	Laurence Cant	Eastern Suburbs	11

==== Hat-Tricks ====
Player	Team	Opponent	Result	Date
Zachary Kierpal	Moreton City Excelsior	Brisbane City	3–1 (A)	22 February 2025
Luke Beckwith	Gold Coast United	Lions FC	4–2 (A)	18 May 2025
Masashi Yokoyama	Brisbane City	Eastern Suburbs	5–2 (A)	7 June 2025
Marquez Walters	Gold Coast Knights	Brisbane City	5–2 (H)	21 June 2025
Andrew Pengelly	Lions FC	Sunshine Coast Wanderers	4–0 (H)	22 June 2025
Seita Murai	Moreton City Excelsior	Sunshine Coast Wanderers	5–0 (A)	4 July 2025
Jheison Macuace	Peninsula Power	Gold Coast United	7–0 (H)	5 July 2025
Sazdo Gjorgiev	St George Willawong	Sunshine Coast Wanderers	3–2 (H)	10 August 2025
Zach Maltby	Wynnum Wolves	Sunshine Coast Wanderers	6–2 (A)	15 August 2025
Seita Murai	Moreton City Excelsior	Gold Coast Knights	4–0 (H)	15 August 2025

=== 2025 Football Queensland Premier League 1 ===
Football Queensland Premier League 1
- Season: 2025
- Dates: 21 February – 12 September
- Champions: Magic United
- Premiers: Magic United
- Relegated: Southside Eagles; SWQ Thunder

The 2025 Football Queensland Premier League 1 season was the eighth season of second division football in Queensland under the Football Queensland Premier League banner. The season ran from 21 February to 24 August, as a double round-robin over 22 rounds, followed by a finals series.

==== League table ====
Pos	Team	Pld	W	D	L	GF	GA	GD	Pts	Qualification or relegation
1	Magic United (C, P)	22	15	1	6	66	27	+39	43 (Note: Magic United were deducted 3 competition points due to crowd behaviour at the 2024 FQPL 2 Grand Final)	Promotion to 2026 NPL Queensland and qualification for Finals
2	Rochedale Rovers (P)	22	13	4	5	55	26	+29	43	Promotion to 2026 NPL Queensland and qualification for Finals
3	Broadbeach United	22	12	7	3	55	29	+26	43	Qualification for Finals
4	Brisbane Strikers	22	13	3	6	52	28	+24	42	Qualification for Finals
5	Logan Lightning	22	10	4	8	43	42	+1	34	
6	Redlands United	22	9	6	7	42	47	−5	33	
7	Caboolture Sports	22	9	3	10	47	40	+7	30	
8	Holland Park Hawks	22	8	3	11	47	46	+1	27	
9	Ipswich FC	22	5	8	9	24	26	−2	23	
10	Capalaba FC	22	5	3	14	31	59	−28	18	
11	SWQ Thunder (R)	22	5	3	14	26	63	−37	18	Relegation to 2026 FQPL 2
12	Southside Eagles (R)	22	4	3	15	19	74	−55	15	Relegation to 2026 FQPL 2

Updated to match(es) played on 24 August 2025. Source: squadi
Rules for classification: 1) points; 2) goal difference; 3) number of goals scored; 4) head to head record.
(C) Champions; (P) Promoted; (R) Relegated

==== Results ====
Home \ Away	BRS	BRO	CAB	CAP	HPH	IPS	LOG	MAG	RED	ROC	SOU	SWQ
Brisbane Strikers		2–2	1–2	4–1	2–1	0–0	4–1	5–0	4–1	0–5	5–0	2–0
Broadbeach United	3–2		3–2	4–3	2–1	2–0	3–0	2–3	1–2	1–1	5–0	4–1
Caboolture Sports	0–3	0–0		4–1	1–3	1–3	7–0	3–1	2–7	0–1	1–2	6–1
Capalaba FC	2–3	1–4	1–2		3–4	0–3	1–4	1–6	1–1	3–2	1–0	1–2
Holland Park Hawks	2–3	1–3	1–1	2–3		1–1	1–2	3–0	1–4	2–2	5–1	5–2
Ipswich FC	0–1	2–2	0–1	2–4	1–0		3–1	0–1	1–1	1–2	1–1	4–0
Logan Lightning		1–1	2–2	3–1	0–1	0–0		2–0	3–1		3–0	4–2
Magic United	1–2	3–2	2–1	0–0	4–0	3–0	5–0		2–3	2–1	8–1	3–0
Redlands United	1–1	2–2	1–4	0–1	4–3	1–1	0–7	0–5		1–4	1–0	3–2
Rochedale Rovers	2–1	2–2	3–0	6–0	2–3	2–0	3–2	1–4	1–1		5–1	6–0
Southside Eagles	1–6	0–5	1–5	1–0	0–4	0–0	5–4	0–8	1–5	0–1		3–0
SWQ Thunder	2–1	0–2	3–2	2–2	5–3	2–1	1–1	0–5	0–2	0–2	1–1	

Source: squadi
Legend: Blue = home team win; Yellow = draw; Red = away team win.

==== Finals ====
Semifinals
1	Magic United	2
4	Brisbane Strikers	1
2	Rochedale Rovers	3
3	Broadbeach United	0

Grand final
1	Magic United	2
2	Rochedale Rovers	1

=== 2025 Football Queensland Premier League 2 ===
Football Queensland Premier League 2
- Season: 2025
- Dates: 1 March – 5 September
- Champions: Robina City
- Premiers: Robina City
- Relegated: Maroochydore FC; North Lakes United

The 2025 Football Queensland Premier League 2 season was the fifth season of third division football in Queensland under the Football Queensland Premier League 2 banner. The season ran from 1 March to 15 August, as a double round-robin over 22 rounds, followed by a finals series.

==== League table ====
Pos	Team	Pld	W	D	L	GF	GA	GD	Pts	Qualification or relegation
1	Robina City (C, P)	22	19	3	0	87	18	+69	60	Promotion to 2026 FQPL 1 and qualification for Finals
2	North Star (P)	22	15	3	4	50	32	+18	48	Promotion to 2026 FQPL 1 and qualification for Finals
3	Moreton City Reserves	22	15	1	6	62	37	+25	46	Qualification for Finals
4	Grange Thistle	22	9	5	8	50	45	+5	32	Qualification for Finals
5	Taringa Rovers	22	9	2	11	55	66	−11	29	
6	Brisbane Knights	22	8	5	9	67	82	−15	29	
7	Samford Rangers	22	8	2	12	41	58	−17	26	
8	Souths United	22	7	3	12	46	66	−20	24	
9	Mitchelton	22	7	2	13	41	49	−8	23	
10	Pine Hills	22	7	2	13	34	44	−10	23	
11	North Lakes United (R)	22	7	1	14	36	60	−24	22	Relegation to 2026 FQPL 3
12	Maroochydore FC (R)	22	5	3	14	39	51	−12	18	Relegation to 2026 FQPL 3

Updated to match(es) played on 15 August 2025. Source: squadi
Rules for classification: 1) points; 2) goal difference; 3) number of goals scored; 4) head to head record.
(C) Champions; (P) Promoted; (R) Relegated

==== Results ====
Home \ Away	BRK	GRA	MAR	MIT	MOR	NLU	NST	PIN	ROB	SAM	STH	TAR
Brisbane Knights		4–4	4–2		1–8			2–5				
Grange Thistle					1–2							6–3
Maroochydore FC						3–2			1–3	2–3		
Mitchelton	2–2						0–2	4–2		1–2		
Moreton City Reserves			2–1	2–1			2–1					9–2
North Lakes United	4–2	0–5					1–4			1–2		
North Star	4–4											3–1
Pine Hills		1–2	2–1						1–5			
Robina City				5–1	3–1							
Samford Rangers					4–4		1–2	2–3	0–8			
Souths United	5–5	4–1		3–0		3–0	2–4					
Taringa Rovers						3–2				2–3	2–2	

Source: squadi
Legend: Blue = home team win; Yellow = draw; Red = away team win.

==== Finals ====
Semifinals
1	Robina City	5
4	Grange Thistle	4
2	North Star	5
3	Moreton City Reserves	3

Grand final
Robina City	2
North Star	1

=== 2025 Kappa Pro Series ===
Group A

Pos	Team	Pld	W	D	L	GF	GA	GD	Pts	
1	Lions FC (A)	5	5	0	0	25	3	+22	15	Advance to the Quarter Finals
2	Brisbane Strikers (A)	5	4	0	1	12	8	+4	12	Advance to the Quarter Finals
3	Wynnum Wolves	5	1	2	2	7	9	−2	5	
4	Redlands United	5	1	1	3	8	15	−7	4	
5	SWQ Thunder	5	1	1	3	5	16	−11	4	
6	St George Willawong	5	0	2	3	4	10	−6	2	

(A) Advance to a further round

Group B

Pos	Team	Pld	W	D	L	GF	GA	GD	Pts	
1	Peninsula Power (A)	5	5	0	0	18	5	+13	15	Advance to the Quarter Finals
2	Sunshine Coast Wanderers (A)	5	3	0	2	14	15	−1	9	Advance to the Quarter Finals
3	Logan Lightning	5	2	1	2	9	7	+2	7	
4	Eastern Suburbs	5	2	1	2	7	7	0	7	
5	Ipswich FC	5	2	0	3	12	10	+2	6	
6	Capalaba FC	5	0	0	5	3	19	−16	0	

(A) Advance to a further round

Group C

Pos	Team	Pld	W	D	L	GF	GA	GD	Pts	
1	Gold Coast United (A)	5	3	2	0	20	7	+13	11	Advance to the Quarter Finals
2	Moreton City Excelsior (A)	5	3	1	1	17	6	+11	10	Advance to the Quarter Finals
3	Olympic FC	5	3	1	1	12	6	+6	10	
4	Holland Park Hawks	5	2	0	3	10	14	−4	6	
5	Caboolture Sports	5	1	0	4	6	11	−5	3	
6	Southside Eagles	5	1	0	4	4	25	−21	3	

Updated to match(es) played on unknown. Source:
(A) Advance to a further round

Group D

Pos	Team	Pld	W	D	L	GF	GA	GD	Pts	
1	Rochedale Rovers (A)	5	3	1	1	6	4	+2	10	Advance to the Quarter Finals
2	Brisbane Roar Youth (A)	5	2	2	1	8	4	+4	8	Advance to the Quarter Finals
3	Brisbane City	5	2	1	2	15	9	+6	7	
4	Gold Coast Knights	4	0	4	0	4	4	0	4	
5	Broadbeach United	5	1	1	3	8	13	−5	4	
6	Magic United	4	1	1	2	5	12	−7	4	

Updated to match(es) played on unknown. Source:
(A) Advance to a further round

Knockout Stage

Quarterfinals
Peninsula Power	1
Brisbane Strikers	3
Rochedale Rovers	0
Moreton City Excelsior	1
Gold Coast United	0
Brisbane Roar Youth	4
Lions FC	2
Sunshine Coast Wanderers	1

Semifinals
Brisbane Strikers	2
Moreton City Excelsior	3
Brisbane Roar Youth	2
Lions FC	3

Finals
Moreton City Excelsior	0
Lions FC	1

== Women's League Tables ==
=== 2025 Women's National Premier Leagues Queensland ===
Women's NPL Queensland
- Season: 2025
- Dates: 8 February – 12 September

The 2025 Women's National Premier Leagues Queensland season was the eleventh season of women's first division football in Queensland under the National Premier Leagues banner. The regular season ran from 8 February to 22 August, as a triple round-robin over 27 rounds, followed by a finals series.

==== League table ====
Pos	Team	Pld	W	D	L	GF	GA	GD	Pts	Qualification or relegation
1	Lions FC	12	7	3	2	36	7	+29	24	Qualification for Finals
2	Eastern Suburbs	10	7	1	2	34	12	+22	22	Qualification for Finals
3	Gold Coast Knights	10	7	1	2	24	11	+13	22	Qualification for Finals
4	Souths United	12	7	1	4	31	21	+10	22	Qualification for Finals
5	Brisbane City	11	6	2	3	20	11	+9	20	
6	Sunshine Coast Wanderers	11	6	0	5	19	21	−2	18	
7	North Lakes United	9	2	1	6	11	25	−14	7	
8	Mitchelton	11	2	1	8	11	35	−24	7	Relegation to 2026 FQPL 1 Women
9	FQ Academy QAS	11	2	0	9	12	40	−28	6	
10	Gold Coast United	9	1	2	6	8	23	−15	5	Relegation to 2026 FQPL 1 Women

Source: squadi
Rules for classification: 1) points; 2) goal difference; 3) number of goals scored; 4) head to head record.

==== Results ====
Home \ Away	BCY	EAS	QAS	GCK	GCU	LFC	MIT	NLU	STH	SCW	BCY	EAS	QAS	GCK	GCU	LFC	MIT	NLU	STH	SCW
Brisbane City		3–0	3–0	0–2				2–1	4–3	3–0				1–1						
Eastern Suburbs					3–0		6–0		4–3										5–0	
FQ Academy QAS	2–1	0–6		1–3	2–4	0–3	4–3		1–5							0–5				
Gold Coast Knights		2–1	5–2					6–1												
Gold Coast United		0–4				0–4														
Lions FC	0–0			2–0	1–1			6–0	2–2	0–1				0–2						
Mitchelton				0–2	1–1	1–7		0–4	0–1	4–2						2–1				
North Lakes United	0–3	2–2								1–0										
Souths United	2–0		2–0	3–1	4–1		4–0													
Sunshine Coast Wanderers		2–3			2–0	0–6	3–0	4–1	3–2						2–1					

Source: squadi
Legend: Blue = home team win; Yellow = draw; Red = away team win.

==== Finals ====
Semifinals
1
4
2
3

Grand final

=== 2025 Women's Football Queensland Premier League 1 ===
Women's Football Queensland Premier League 1
- Season: 2025
- Dates: 15 March – 12 September

The 2025 Women's Football Queensland Premier League 1 season was the second division of women's football in Queensland in 2025. The regular season ran from 15 March to 24 August, as a double round-robin over 18 rounds, followed by a finals series.

==== League table ====
Pos	Team	Pld	W	D	L	GF	GA	GD	Pts	Qualification or relegation
1	Olympic FC	5	5	0	0	12	1	+11	15	Promotion to 2026 Women's NPL Queensland and qualification for Finals
2	Capalaba FC	4	4	0	0	14	3	+11	12	Promotion to 2026 Women's NPL Queensland and qualification for Finals
3	Virginia United	5	4	0	1	10	7	+3	12	Qualification for Finals
4	Caboolture Sports	4	3	0	1	8	3	+5	9	Qualification for Finals
5	Grange Thistle	5	2	1	2	7	6	+1	7	
6	Moreton Bay Excelsior	6	2	0	4	10	15	−5	6	
7	North Brisbane	6	1	1	4	12	20	−8	4	
8	Logan Lightning	5	1	0	4	7	13	−6	3	
9	Peninsula Power	4	1	0	3	5	11	−6	3	Relegation to 2026 Women's FQPL 2
10	SWQ Thunder	6	1	0	5	5	11	−6	3	Relegation to 2026 Women's FQPL 2

Updated to match(es) played on unknown. Source: squadi
Rules for classification: 1) points; 2) goal difference; 3) number of goals scored; 4) head to head record.

==== Results ====
Home \ Away	CAB	CAP	GRA	LOG	MCE	NBR	OLY	PEN	SWQ	VIR
Caboolture Sports				3–1			0–1	2–1		
Capalaba FC			2–1			6–0		4–2		
Grange Thistle						3–3				
Logan Lightning					1–3					2–3
Moreton Bay Excelsior			0–2							1–2
North Brisbane				2–3	4–2				2–3	1–3
Olympic FC			1–0		4–1			5–0	1–0	
Peninsula Power				2–0						
SWQ Thunder		0–2	0–1		2–3					
Virginia United	0–3								2–0	

Source: squadi
Legend: Blue = home team win; Yellow = draw; Red = away team win.

==== Finals ====
Semifinals
1
2
3

Grand final

=== 2025 Women's Football Queensland Premier League 2 ===
Women's Football Queensland Premier League 2
- Season: 2025
- Dates: 15 March – 5 September

The 2024 Women's Football Queensland Premier League 2 season was the third division of women's football in Queensland in 2024.The regular season ran from 15 March to 16 August, as a double round-robin over 18 rounds, followed by a finals series.

==== League table ====
Pos	Team	Pld	W	D	L	GF	GA	GD	Pts	Qualification or relegation
1	Palm Beach	6	4	2	0	25	7	+18	14	Promotion to 2026 Women's FQPL 1 and qualification for Finals
2	Samford Rangers	5	4	0	1	26	14	+12	12	Promotion to 2026 Women's FQPL 1 and qualification for Finals
3	Ipswich Knights	3	3	0	0	8	2	+6	9	Qualification for Finals
4	Annerley FC	5	3	0	2	15	11	+4	9	Qualification for Finals
5	The Gap	5	2	0	3	15	12	+3	6	
6	Holland Park Hawks	4	1	2	1	6	8	−2	5	
7	UQ FC	5	1	2	2	4	6	−2	5	
8	Mt Gravatt Hawks	3	0	2	1	5	11	−6	2	
9	Southside Eagles	4	0	1	3	8	18	−10	1	Relegation to 2026 Women's FQPL 3
10	Pine Hills	6	0	1	5	5	28	−23	1	Relegation to 2026 Women's FQPL 3

Source: squadi
Rules for classification: 1) points; 2) goal difference; 3) number of goals scored; 4) head to head record.

==== Results ====
Home \ Away	ANN	HPH	IPK	MGH	PAL	PIN	SAM	SOU	GAP	UQ
Annerley FC		5–2	1–2							
Holland Park Hawks				3–3						0–0
Ipswich Knights						4–0				
Mt Gravatt Hawks					1–7					1–1
Palm Beach						2–2		2–2		3–0
Pine Hills		0–1							3–6	0–2
Samford Rangers	4–1				1–8	13–0			3–2	
Southside Eagles	2–6						3–5			
The Gap			1–2		1–3			5–1		
UQ FC	1–2									

Updated to match(es) played on unknown. Source: squadi
Legend: Blue = home team win; Yellow = draw; Red = away team win.

==== Finals ====
Semifinals
1
4
2
3

Grand final

=== 2025 Kappa Pro Series ===
Group A

Pos	Team	Pld	W	D	L	GF	GA	GD	Pts	
1	Virginia (A)	3	2	1	0	10	4	+6	7	Advance to the Quarter Finals
2	The Gap (A)	3	2	1	0	7	4	+3	7	Advance to the Quarter Finals
3	Pine Hills	3	1	0	2	7	10	−3	3	
4	SWQ Thunder	3	0	0	3	3	9	−6	0	

(A) Advance to a further round

Group B

Pos	Team	Pld	W	D	L	GF	GA	GD	Pts	
1	Grange Thistle (A)	3	3	0	0	13	3	+10	9	Advance to the Quarter Finals
2	UQ FC (A)	3	2	0	1	10	6	+4	6	Advance to the Quarter Finals
3	Logan Lightning	3	1	0	2	5	6	−1	3	
4	Holland Park Hawks	3	0	0	3	1	14	−13	0	

(A) Advance to a further round

Group C

Pos	Team	Pld	W	D	L	GF	GA	GD	Pts	
1	Olympic FC (A)	3	3	0	0	19	3	+16	9	Advance to the Quarter Finals
2	Moreton City Excelsior	3	2	0	1	7	6	+1	6	
3	Ipswich Knights	3	1	0	2	5	10	−5	3	
4	Samford Rangers	3	0	0	3	3	15	−12	0	

Updated to match(es) played on unknown. Source:
(A) Advance to a further round

Group D

Pos	Team	Pld	W	D	L	GF	GA	GD	Pts	
1	North Brisbane (A)	3	2	1	0	11	4	+7	7	Advanced to the Quarter Finals
2	Capalaba FC (A)	3	2	0	1	13	7	+6	6	Advanced to the Quarter Finals
3	Peninsula Power	3	1	1	1	9	11	−2	4	
4	Southside Eagles	3	0	0	3	4	15	−11	0	

(A) Advance to a further round

Group E

Pos	Team	Pld	W	D	L	GF	GA	GD	Pts	
1	Caboolture Sports (A)	3	3	0	0	17	2	+15	9	Advance to the Quarter Finals
2	Palm Beach	3	1	1	1	11	9	+2	4	
3	Annerley FC	3	0	2	1	5	9	−4	2	
4	Mt Gravatt Hawks	3	0	1	2	5	18	−13	1	

(A) Advance to a further round

Knockout Stage

Quarterfinals
North Brisbane
Caboolture Sports
Virginia
UQ FC
Olympic FC
The Gap
Grange Thistle
Capalaba FC

Semifinals

Finals
