= Moggill FC =

- Full name: Moggill Football Club
- Founded: 1974
- Ground: Bellbowrie Sports Club, Bellbowrie
- League: Capital League 1
- 2016: 9th
- Website: https://www.moggillfc.org.au/

Moggill FC is an Australian football (soccer) club from Bellbowrie, a suburb of Brisbane. The club was formed in 1974, and currently competes in WFQPL3 & FQPL4.

== History ==
Moggill United Soccer Club was formed by Robbie Roosen in 1974 and experienced early success in its junior ranks, with its inaugural Under 7 team becoming Brisbane champions.

The club commenced fielding teams at a senior level in the 1978 season, with their first grade squad entering competition in Brisbane's Division Five. The club's first grade team won three grand finals between 1985 and 1996. Since promotion to the third tier of Brisbane competition in 1996, the club has been a consistent performer and has not been relegated since.

The club changed its name to Moggill Football Club in 2006. In 2010 the club achieved promotion to the second tier of Brisbane football (fourth tier nationally) where it has remained since, and has finished mid-table in its recent seasons in Capital League 1.

Moggill FC had an impressive cup run in 2016, winning several ties on its way to the Sixth Round of the 2016 FFA Cup preliminary rounds, including a huge upset 4–1 away victory against NPL Queensland club Olympic FC, before bowing out 7–0 to BPL club Lions FC.

Moggill FC had a tough season in 2017 with no points scored during the season and relegation to the fifth tier of football. Maintaining a place in Capital 1 the following season due to the creation of the FQPL1 league. After a lift in form in 2018 to reach a 7th-placed finish 2019 dealt another blow to Moggill FC with them dropping to division 2 for the first time since 2010. This now being the 6th tier of football rather than the 5th in 2010.

2020 shows a promotion after a 5th-placed finish due to another restructure of the leagues with the FQPL2 being introduced. COVID played a part in this season with it being cut short to only 16 games.

2021 was the year of cup runs for Moggill FC which included an upset at Caboolture FC beating them 1-0 before eventually bowing out to Ipswich Knights 2–0 in the preliminary round 4 of the FFA Cup. Another cup run in the Canale Cup winning all games up to the final 3-2 (Kangaroo Point Rovers, Annerley (AET), Logan Metro), before finally losing to Albany Creek Excelsior at Perry Park in the final 2–1.

== Recent Seasons ==
| Season | League | | | | | | | | | | | FFA Cup |
| Season | Division (tier) | Pld | W | D | L | GF | GA | GD | Pts | Position | Finals Series | FFA Cup |
|---|---|---|---|---|---|---|---|---|---|---|---|---|
| 2008 | Premier Division 2 (5) | 22 | 9 | 5 | 8 | 52 | 43 | 9 | 32 | 6th | DNQ | Not yet founded |
| 2009 | Premier Division 2 (5) | 22 | 4 | 2 | 16 | 22 | 64 | -42 | 14 | 12th | DNQ | Not yet founded |
| 2010 | Premier Division 2 (5) | 22 | 14 | 3 | 5 | 63 | 37 | 26 | 45 | 2nd ↑ | Runners-up | Not yet founded |
| 2011 | Premier Division 1 (4) | 26 | 13 | 1 | 12 | 63 | 50 | 13 | 40 | 5th | DNQ | Not yet founded |
| 2012 | Premier Division 1 (4) | 22 | 12 | 5 | 9 | 66 | 49 | 17 | 41 | 7th | DNQ | Not yet founded |
| 2013 | Capital League 1 (4) | 22 | 11 | 5 | 6 | 54 | 30 | 24 | 38 | 5th | DNQ | Not yet founded |
| 2014 | Capital League 1 (4) | 22 | 11 | 5 | 6 | 45 | 37 | 8 | 38 | 4th | Semi-Finalist | Preliminary Round 2 |
| 2015 | Capital League 1 (4) | 21 | 9 | 4 | 8 | 41 | 36 | 5 | 31 | 6th | DNQ | Preliminary Round 4 |
| 2016 | Capital League 1 (4) | 22 | 8 | 3 | 11 | 40 | 63 | -23 | 27 | 9th | DNQ | Preliminary Round 6 |
| 2017 | Capital League 1 (4) | 22 | 0 | 0 | 22 | 19 | 124 | -105 | 0 | 12th ↓ | DNQ | Preliminary Round 2 |
| 2018 | Capital League 1 (5) | 22 | 10 | 2 | 10 | 52 | 59 | -7 | 32 | 7th | DNQ | Preliminary Round 2 |
| 2019 | Capital League 1 (5) | 22 | 4 | 4 | 14 | 35 | 62 | -27 | 16 | 11th ↓ | DNQ | Preliminary Round 3 |
| 2020 | Capital League 2 (6) | 16 | 6 | 2 | 8 | 21 | 29 | -8 | 20 | 5th ↑ | DNQ | Preliminary Round 2 |
| 2021 | Capital League 1 (6) | 20 | 7 | 8 | 5 | 46 | 37 | 9 | 29 | 6th | DNQ | Preliminary Round 4 |

| Key: | Premiers / Champions | Promoted ↑ | Relegated ↓ |

The tier is the level in the Australian soccer league system

== Honours ==
- Brisbane Division 4 – Champions 1985
- Brisbane Division 5 – Premiers and Champions 1987
- Brisbane Division 4 – Premiers and Champions 1996
- Canale Cup - Runners Up 2021
- FQPLW3 Premiers 2025
