= Pine Rivers United SC =

Pine Rivers United Sports Club
- Full name: Pine Rivers United Sports Club
- Nickname: The Predators
- Founded: 1967
- Ground: Wendy Allison Park
- 2017: 11th
- Website: http://www.pineriversunited.org.au/

Pine Rivers United is an Australian football (soccer) club from Strathpine, a suburb of Pine Rivers, just north of Brisbane, Queensland, Australia. The club was formed in 1967, and last played in Brisbane's Capital League 2 in 2017 after being relegated the previous season. Following the 2017 season, the club was stripped of its playing license by Football Brisbane and the license was transferred to Pine Rivers Athletic Football Club - which is run as a wholly separate entity.

Pine Rivers United Sports Club is located in the heart of the Moreton Bay Region (formerly Pine Rivers Shire) at Wendy Allison Park, facing busy Samsonvale Road, Strathpine. It is a fully licensed club with gaming machines and caters for social darts. Whilst originally a multi-sports club, the club's core sport is now only Darts, although it does host football matches.

== History ==
Pine Rivers United was formed as a football club in 1967 by a local man Jack Gurteen, from a group of Pine Rivers High School students who enjoyed kicking a soccer ball around in their lunch time. The lads approached Jack and a game was arranged with Redcliffe City Under 14's at Redcliffe. The Pine Rivers team lost 5–3. As a result, parents of the team players decided to get together and start a club. At the same time a number of youngsters from Lawnton State School aged 9–12-year-old came along and asked for a game. Jack arranged a game against Zillmere, but Rivers lost 16–0. The Club later became incorporated as a multi-sports club. The current clubhouse was built in 1978.

In 1968 the club fielded several junior teams, and one senior team in the 7th Division. The senior team achieved promotion in the following four seasons, and in 1972 they were Premiers and Grand Finalists.

After finishing the 1988 season as Division 2 premiers, Pine Rivers United were promoted to the Brisbane Premier League (then known as XXXX league) for the first time. The club reached the finals series in their first four BPL season under the stewardship of former Brisbane City and Motherwell veteran Bob Hamilton. Young players at this time were Noel Carrol, and Clayton Koch who was sold at the end of the 1990 season to Sydney Croatia FC.

Pine Rivers United participated in 17 of the 22 Brisbane Premier League seasons between 1989 and 2010. Pine Rivers' greatest achievement during these years was becoming Premier League champions in 2005 after winning the Grand Final 1–0 in extra time against Palm Beach. In 2009, after three rounds Pine Rivers sat last on zero points, but turned around their season to finish in 10th place out of 13 clubs, one spot above the relegation zone.

Pine Rivers United finished the 2010 season in 14th place out of 14 teams, and were relegated to the Brisbane Premier Division 1. The club has not since returned to the Brisbane Premier League. In the 2012 season, the club finish 2nd on the table to Albany Creek Excelsior, and won the grand final 3–1 over Logan Lightning, however this wasn't enough to be promoted back into the Premier League for 2013, as promotion for that season was based on special criteria as well as table position. After six seasons in Capital League 1 from 2011 and 2016, the club was relegated to Capital League 2 at the end of the 2016 season.

In cup competition, Pine Rivers United's best performance was winning the Brisbane Premier Cup in 2007 after a 2–1 victory in the Cup Final against Souths United. The club also performed creditably in the 2015 FFA Cup preliminary rounds, winning through four rounds before succumbing to Lions FC in the final preliminary round prior to the competition proper. To date, Pine Rivers are the only club from one of the Capital Leagues (tier 4 or below) to progress this far in the FFA Cup.

== Recent seasons ==
Season	League											FFA Cup
Season	Division (tier)	Pld	W	D	L	GF	GA	GD	Pts	Position	Finals Series	FFA Cup
2008	Brisbane Premier League (3)	22	7	4	11	34	39	−5	25	8th	DNQ	Not yet founded
2009	Brisbane Premier League (3)	24	8	5	11	37	47	−10	29	10th	DNQ	Not yet founded
2010	Brisbane Premier League (3)	26	3	8	15	29	55	−26	17	14th ↓	DNQ	Not yet founded
2011	Premier Division 1 (4)	26	11	4	11	36	42	−6	37	8th	DNQ	Not yet founded
2012	Premier Division 1 (4)	26	17	3	6	65	38	27	54	2nd	Champions	Not yet founded
2013	Capital League 1 (4)	22	10	3	9	53	31	22	33	6th	DNQ	Not yet founded
2014	Capital League 1 (4)	22	9	8	5	51	42	9	35	5th	DNQ	Preliminary Round 1
2015	Capital League 1 (4)	22	10	5	6	45	27	18	35	3rd	Semi-finalist	Preliminary Round 7
2016	Capital League 1 (4)	22	4	1	17	23	82	−59	13	12th ↓	DNQ	Preliminary Round 5
2017	Capital League 2 (5)	22	2	1	19	22	96	−74	7	11th ↓	DNQ	Preliminary Round 3

Key:	Premiers / Champions	Promoted ↑	Relegated ↓

The tier is the level in the Australian soccer league system

== Honours ==
- Brisbane Division 4 – Premiers and Champions 1972
- Brisbane Division 2 – Premiers 1980
- Brisbane Division 1 – Premiers and Champions 1985
- Brisbane Division 2 – Premiers 1988
- Brisbane Division 1 – Premiers and Champions 2002
- Brisbane Premier League – Champions 2005
- Brisbane Premier Division 1 – Champions 2012
