= 2020 in Queensland soccer =

Football Queensland
- Season: 2020
- Champions: Peninsula Power (Premiers)

The 2020 Football Queensland season was the eighth season since NPL Queensland commenced as the top tier of Queensland men’s football. This season was also the third season of the Football Queensland Premier League which occupied the second tier in Queensland men’s football in 2020.

Below NPL Queensland and the FQPL was a regional structure of ten zones with their own leagues. The strongest of the zones was Football Brisbane with its senior men’s competition consisting of four divisions.

The COVID-19 pandemic halted the season for a short period of time in all competitions, however all competitions in Queensland were completed.

== Men's League Tables ==
=== 2020 National Premier Leagues Queensland ===
The NPL Premier normally qualifies for the national NPL finals series, but the 2020 National Premier Leagues finals series was cancelled in July.

Pos	Team	Pld	W	D	L	GF	GA	GD	Pts	Qualification or relegation (Note: Games against Mackay & Whitsundays Magpies Crusaders United now counted as byes.)
1	Peninsula Power	24	19	1	4	54	25	+29	58	2020 Queensland Finals
2	Olympic FC	24	16	5	3	54	21	+33	53	2020 Queensland Finals
3	Gold Coast Knights	24	15	6	3	57	27	+30	51	2020 Queensland Finals
4	Lions FC (C)	24	14	4	6	64	26	+38	46	2020 Queensland Finals
5	Moreton Bay United	24	9	5	10	46	55	−9	32	
6	Brisbane Strikers	24	7	7	10	33	42	−9	28	
7	Eastern Suburbs	24	7	8	9	46	50	−4	29	
8	Brisbane Roar Youth	24	9	3	12	42	41	+1	30	
9	Sunshine Coast Wanderers	24	7	4	13	41	55	−14	25	
10	Redlands United	24	7	2	15	32	64	−32	23	
11	Gold Coast United	24	5	8	11	37	47	−10	23	
12	Capalaba	24	6	2	16	35	72	−37	20	
13	Brisbane City (R)	24	5	5	14	37	53	−16	20	Relegation to the 2021 Queensland Premier League
14	Magpies Crusaders United (W)	0	0	0	0	0	0	0	0	Withdrew (Note: Withdrew during the season hiatus caused by the COVID-19 pandemic in Australia.)

Source: sportstg.com
Rules for classification: 1) points; 2) number of wins; 3) goal difference; 4) number of goals scored.
(C) Champions; (R) Relegated; (W) Withdrew

==== Finals ====
Semi-finals
2	Olympic FC	2
3	Gold Coast Knights	1
1	Peninsula Power	1
4	Lions FC	4

Grand Final
Olympic FC	0
Lions FC	1

=== 2020 Football Queensland Premier League ===
Pos	Team	Pld	W	D	L	GF	GA	GD	Pts	Qualification or relegation
1	Logan Lightning (C)	20	15	3	2	58	19	+39	48	Promotion to the 2021 NPL Queensland
2	SWQ Thunder	20	15	1	4	61	27	+34	46	
3	Mitchelton FC	20	10	6	4	41	34	+7	36	
4	Wolves FC	20	11	1	8	53	36	+17	34	
5	Rochedale Rovers	20	10	4	6	37	26	+11	34	
6	Ipswich Knights	20	9	3	8	41	34	+7	30	
7	Western Pride FC	20	9	1	10	42	46	−4	28	
8	Sunshine Coast FC	20	6	4	10	31	49	−18	22	
9	Holland Park Hawks	20	3	4	13	24	45	−21	13	
10	Souths United	20	3	3	14	30	65	−35	12	
11	Southside Eagles	20	2	4	14	22	59	−37	10	

Source: mygameday
Rules for classification: 1) points; 2) number of wins; 3) goal difference; 4) number of goals scored.
(C) Champions

==== Finals ====
Semi-finals
2	SWQ Thunder	2
3	Mitchelton FC	0
1	Logan Lightning	3
4	Wolves FC	1

Grand Final
SWQ Thunder	1
Logan Lightning	2

=== 2020 Brisbane Premier League ===
The 2020 Brisbane Premier League was the 38th edition of the Brisbane Premier League (the third level domestic association football competition in Queensland).

Pos	Team	Pld	W	D	L	GF	GA	GD	Pts	Qualification or relegation (Note: Teams were split into two groups (Premier and Plate) after each played 11 matches in the first Stage.)
1	St George Willawong	16	15	1	0	46	20	+26	46	
2	Albany Creek Excelsior	16	12	1	3	51	21	+30	37	
3	Toowong	16	9	3	4	33	17	+16	30	
4	Grange Thistle	16	9	2	5	40	24	+16	29	
5	Taringa Rovers	16	8	2	6	38	31	+7	26	
6	Centenary Stormers	16	5	2	9	25	33	−8	17	
7	Acacia Ridge	16	7	0	9	26	36	−10	21	
8	Bayside United	16	5	4	7	31	23	+8	19	
9	Brisbane Knights	16	6	0	10	30	41	−11	18	
10	Caboolture Sports	16	4	1	11	22	52	−30	13	
11	The Gap	16	3	2	11	24	45	−21	11	
12	North Star	16	3	2	11	21	44	−23	11	

Source: Mygameday (Premier group) Mygameday (Plate group)
Rules for classification: 1) points; 2) goal difference; 3) number of goals scored.

== Cup Competitions ==
=== FFA Cup Qualifiers ===
Queensland-based soccer clubs commenced the 2020 FFA Cup preliminary rounds in February, only to see it suspended due to the impacts from the pandemic. At the time of suspension, only the first few rounds had been played or partially played. The competition was cancelled on 3 July.
