= 2021 in Queensland soccer =

Football Queensland Season
- Season: 2021

The 2021 Football Queensland season was the ninth season since NPL Queensland commenced as the top tier of Queensland men’s football. This season was also the fourth season of the Football Queensland Premier League and the inaugural season of the Football Queensland Premier League 2, representing the second and third tiers of Queensland men's football respectively.

Below NPL Queensland and the FQPL was a regional structure of ten zones with their own leagues. The strongest of the zones was Football Brisbane with its senior men’s competition consisting of four divisions. The COVID-19 pandemic halted the season for a short period of time in all competitions, however all competitions in Queensland were completed.

== Men's League Tables ==
=== 2021 National Premier Leagues Queensland ===
NPL Queensland
- Season: 2021
- Champions: Lions FC
- Premiers: Peninsula Power
- Relegated: Magpies Crusaders United
- Matches: 182
- Goals: 702 (3.86 per match)
- Top goalscorer: Andy Pengelly (30 goals)

The season was suspended between late July and late August due to the impacts from the COVID-19 pandemic in Australia. The NPL Premier normally qualifies for the national NPL finals series, but the 2021 National Premier Leagues finals series was cancelled.

Pos	Team	Pld	W	D	L	GF	GA	GD	Pts	Qualification or relegation
1	Peninsula Power	26	19	3	4	72	25	+47	60	2021 NPL Queensland Finals
2	Brisbane Roar Youth	26	17	4	5	82	31	+51	55	2021 NPL Queensland Finals
3	Olympic FC	26	16	7	3	52	19	+33	55	2021 NPL Queensland Finals
4	Lions FC (C)	26	16	5	5	76	34	+42	53	2021 NPL Queensland Finals
5	Sunshine Coast Wanderers	26	16	3	7	58	42	+16	51	
6	Gold Coast Knights	26	15	1	10	53	40	+13	46	
7	Moreton Bay United	26	14	3	9	75	57	+18	45	
8	Gold Coast United	26	11	4	11	47	39	+8	37	
9	Eastern Suburbs	26	9	5	12	37	58	−21	32	
10	Logan Lightning	26	8	5	13	44	54	−10	29	
11	Capalaba	26	7	3	16	33	70	−37	24	
12	Redlands United (R)	26	5	3	18	32	67	−35	18	Relegation to 2022 FQPL 1
13	Brisbane Strikers (R)	26	2	2	22	21	81	−60	8	Relegation to 2022 FQPL 1
14	Magpies Crusaders United (R)	26	2	2	22	20	85	−65	8	Relegation to 2022 FQPL 1

Source: mygameday
Rules for classification: 1) points; 2) goal difference; 3) number of goals scored.
(C) Champions; (R) Relegated

==== Finals ====
Semi-finals
1	Peninsula Power	0
4	Lions FC	1
2	Brisbane Roar Youth	0
3	Olympic FC	3

Grand Final
Lions FC	3
Olympic FC	1

=== 2021 Football Queensland Premier League 1 ===
Football Queensland Premier League 1
- Season: 2021
- Champions: Brisbane City
- Premiers: Brisbane City
- Promoted: Brisbane City
- Relegated: Wolves FC
- Matches: 110
- Goals: 424 (3.85 per match)
- Top goalscorer: Shuto Kuboyama (16 goals)

Pos	Team	Pld	W	D	L	GF	GA	GD	Pts	Qualification or relegation
1	Brisbane City (P, C)	20	20	0	0	64	12	+52	60	Promotion to 2022 NPL Queensland
2	Rochedale Rovers	20	14	1	5	57	26	+31	43	2021 FQPL 1 Finals
3	SWQ Thunder	20	13	2	5	47	32	+15	41	2021 FQPL 1 Finals
4	Western Pride FC	20	10	2	8	36	33	+3	32	2021 FQPL 1 Finals
5	Ipswich Knights Soccer Club	20	9	3	8	41	35	+6	30	
6	Mitchelton FC	20	9	1	10	41	43	−2	28	
7	Southside Eagles	20	6	6	8	30	33	−3	24	
8	Sunshine Coast FC	20	6	5	9	33	40	−7	23	
9	Souths United (R)	20	5	0	15	28	54	−26	15	Relegation to 2022 FQPL 2
10	Holland Park Hawks (R)	20	3	3	14	29	54	−25	12	Relegation to 2022 FQPL 2
11	Wolves FC (R)	20	3	1	16	18	62	−44	10	Relegation to 2022 FQPL 2

Source: mygameday
Rules for classification: 1) points; 2) number of wins; 3) goal difference; 4) number of goals scored.
(C) Champions; (P) Promoted; (R) Relegated

==== Finals ====
Semi-finals
3	SWQ Thunder	2
2	Rochedale Rovers	0
1	Brisbane City	3
4	Western Pride	2

Grand Final
SWQ Thunder	1
Brisbane City	4

=== 2021 Football Queensland Premier League 2 ===
Football Queensland Premier League 2
- Season: 2021
- Champions: Grange Thistle
- Premiers: Caboolture Sports
- Promoted: Caboolture Sports
- Matches: 84
- Goals: 367 (4.37 per match)
- Top goalscorer: Sean Karambasis (20 goals)

Pos	Team	Pld	W	D	L	GF	GA	GD	Pts	Qualification or relegation
1	Caboolture Sports (P)	21	15	2	4	73	20	+53	47	Promotion to 2022 FQPL 1
2	Taringa Rovers	21	11	6	4	49	23	+26	39	2021 FQPL 2 Finals
3	Grange Thistle (C)	21	11	6	4	43	25	+18	39	2021 FQPL 2 Finals
4	North Star	21	10	4	7	52	39	+13	34	2021 FQPL 2 Finals
5	Magic United	21	10	3	8	45	44	+1	33	
6	Samford Rangers	21	6	3	12	42	48	−6	21	
7	Virginia United	21	6	3	12	43	70	−27	21	
8	Coomera Colts	21	1	1	19	20	98	−78	4	

Source: mygameday
Rules for classification: 1) points; 2) number of wins; 3) goal difference; 4) number of goals scored.
(C) Champions; (P) Promoted

==== Finals ====
Semi-finals
3	Grange Thistle	4
2	Taringa Rovers	1
1	Caboolture Sports	3
4	North Star	1

Grand Final
Grange Thistle	3
Caboolture Sports	1

== Cup Competitions ==
=== FFA Cup Qualifiers ===
Queensland-based soccer clubs competed in 2021 in the preliminary rounds for the 2021 FFA Cup. The four winners of Seventh Round qualified for the final rounds of the FFA Cup; Edge Hill United representing Central and North Queensland, with Gold Coast Knights, Lions FC and Peninsula Power representing South East Queensland. In addition, A-League club Brisbane Roar qualified for the final rounds, entering at the Round of 32.
