= North Pine United SC =

North Pine SC
- Full name: North Pine Sports Club
- Nickname: Gorillas
- Ground: Bob Brock Park
- League: FQPL 3 – Metro
- 2025: 7th of 13
- Website: http://www.northpinesportsclub.com.au/

North Pine Sports Club is an Australian football (soccer) club from Dakabin, a suburb of the City of Moreton Bay, Queensland, Australia. The club currently play in the FQLD 3 – Metro.

== History ==
North Pine United Soccer Club was formed in 1974, originally playing its home games on the centre arena of the Lawnton Showgrounds.

The club commenced fielding teams competitively in 1977, by joining the Brisbane North Junior Soccer Association and fielding a senior team in Brisbane's Division Seven. It was at this time North Pine moved to its current headquarters at Bob Brock Park in Dakabin, with the original clubrooms being constructed in 1983.

From 1978 to 1993, the club played 16 seasons in Division Four and Five. Since winning promotion for a second time from Division Four in 1996, North Pine have remained within the top three divisions of Football Brisbane competition.

In 2002, the club assumed its present name, the North Pine Sports Club, reflecting the incorporation of the club's football and netball teams.

Successive promotions and premierships in 2006 and 2007 saw the club rise to the Brisbane Premier League for the first time in the club's history. Since 2008, North Pine has regularly moved between the Brisbane Premier League and Capital League 1, being relegated three times in its five Premier League seasons. The club's best season in the Brisbane Premier League was in 2011 when the club finished in sixth place and qualified for the finals series.

The club play in the Capital League 1 after relegation from Brisbane Premier League in 2016.

== Recent Seasons ==
Season	League											FFA Cup
Season	Division (tier)	Pld	W	D	L	GF	GA	GD	Pts	Position	Finals Series	FFA Cup
2004	Premier Division 2 (4)	22	5	4	13	44	63	−19	19	9th	DNQ	Not yet founded
2005	Premier Division 2 (4)	22	11	1	10	57	42	15	34	7th	DNQ	Not yet founded
2006	Premier Division 2 (4)	22	17	2	3	67	24	43	53	1st ↑	Champions	Not yet founded
2007	Premier Division 1 (3)	22	18	3	1	70	31	39	57	1st ↑	Semi-finalist	Not yet founded
2008	Brisbane Premier League (3)	22	7	4	11	34	46	−12	25	9th	DNQ	Not yet founded
2009	Brisbane Premier League (3)	24	4	3	17	25	54	−29	15	12th ↓	DNQ	Not yet founded
2010	Premier Division 1 (4)	26	17	3	6	54	33	21	54	1st ↑	Runners-up	Not yet founded
2011	Brisbane Premier League (3)	26	12	4	10	47	41	6	40	6th ↓	DNQ	Not yet founded
2012	Brisbane Premier League (3)	26	3	4	19	32	86	−54	13	13th ↓	DNQ	Not yet founded
2013	Capital League 1 (4)	22	7	3	12	46	60	−14	24	10th	DNQ	Not yet founded
2014	Capital League 1 (4)	22	7	5	10	40	40	0	26	6th	DNQ	Preliminary Round 1
2015	Capital League 1 (4)	21	13	1	7	35	25	10	40	2nd ↑	Runners-up	Preliminary Round 6
2016	Brisbane Premier League (3)	22	3	2	17	29	84	−55	11	12th ↓	DNQ	Preliminary Round 3
2017	Capital League 1 (4)	22	14	3	5	65	38	27	45	2nd	Runners-up	Preliminary Round 4

Key:	Premiers / Champions	Promoted ↑	Relegated ↓

The tier is the level in the Australian soccer league system. Tiers were adjusted when the Qld State League commenced in 2008.

== Honours ==
- Brisbane Division 1 – Champions 1998; Premiers 1999
- Brisbane Premier Division 2 – Premiers and Champions 2006
- Brisbane Premier Division 1 – Premiers 2007 and 2010
