= Kangaroo Point Rovers FC =

Kangaroo Point Rovers
- Full name: Kangaroo Point Rovers Football Club
- Nicknames: KPR, Pineapple Rovers, The Piney Boys, The Piney Girls
- Founded: 1886; 140 years ago, as Pineapple Rovers; 1996; 30 years ago as Pineapple Rovers Soccer FC
- Ground: Raymond Park
- Club President: Steve Silvester
- Head Coach: Sean Grady
- League: Football Queensland Premier League 5 − Metro
- 2023: 4th (GF Champions)
- Website: https://www.kangaroopointrovers.com.au/
Home colours	Away colours

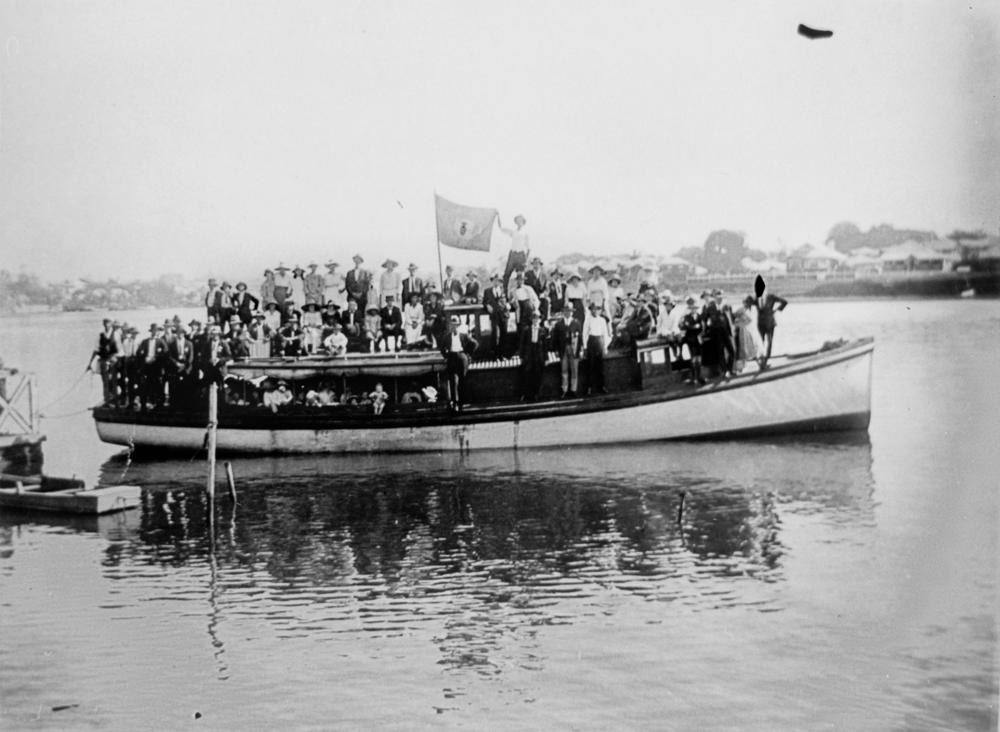
Pineapple Rovers Soccer Club excursion on the river, ca. 1918

Kangaroo Point Rovers FC is an Australian soccer club from Brisbane, Queensland. It was formed in 1996 and currently competes in Division 5 of the Football Queensland Premier League - Metro.

== History ==
The club was formed as Pineapple Rovers Soccer Football Club in 1996. The club is a reincarnation of the original Pineapple Rovers, which was one of the earliest soccer clubs in Queensland. This earlier Pineapple Rovers club won Brisbane Division 1 premierships in 1919, 1924, and 1925 before merging with Shafston Rovers in 1938 to form Eastern Suburbs FC.

The current club first entered Football Queensland Metro competition in 2001 in Division 2, then the fourth tier of Brisbane's football system. The following season, the club won its first honours, defeating Clairvaux FC 2–1 in the Division 3 Grand Final.

In 2005 the club was renamed Kangaroo Point Rovers FC after relocating to its current ground at Raymond Park in Kangaroo Point. The newly renamed club won the Metropolitan League Division 1 Grand Final in 2006 and promotion to Premier Division 2. Kangaroo Point Rovers remained in this division for six seasons until finishing last in 2012 and being relegated to Capital League 3.

The club bounced back immediately, finishing atop Capital League 3 in 2013 and winning the Grand Final 2–1 over Redcliffe PCYC. KPR then had its best-ever cup run in the 2014 Canale Cup (which doubled as the 2014 FFA Cup preliminary rounds), winning through four consecutive rounds until losing to Peninsula Power in the fifth round.

The club's cup form was not replicated in 2014 Capital League 2 and it was relegated after finishing in 10th place. A further relegation in 2015 sent Kangaroo Point Rovers FC compete to Capital League 4.

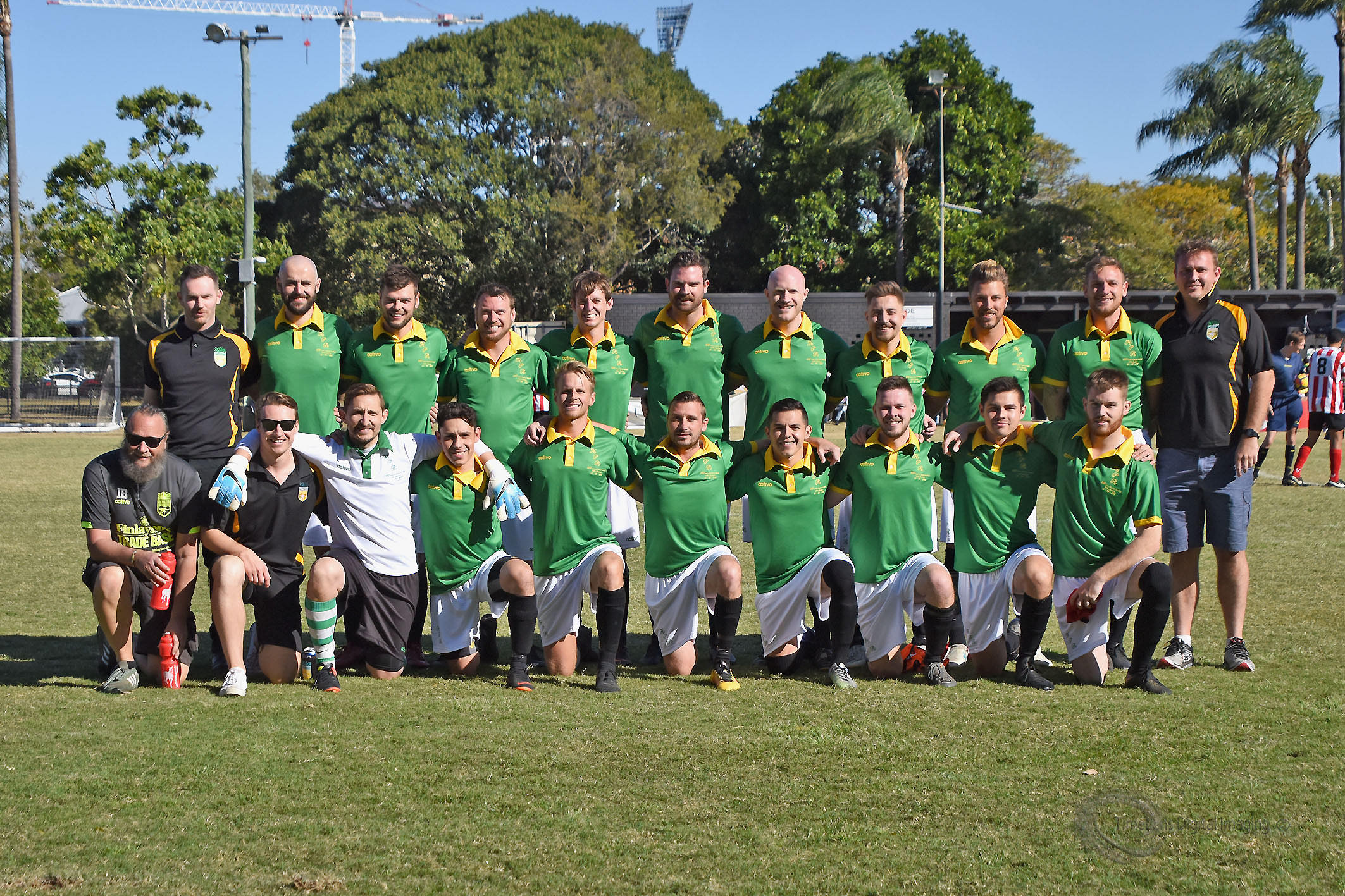
1st team pose for a photo in heritage kit before taking the field to face Bardon Latrobe. August 2018

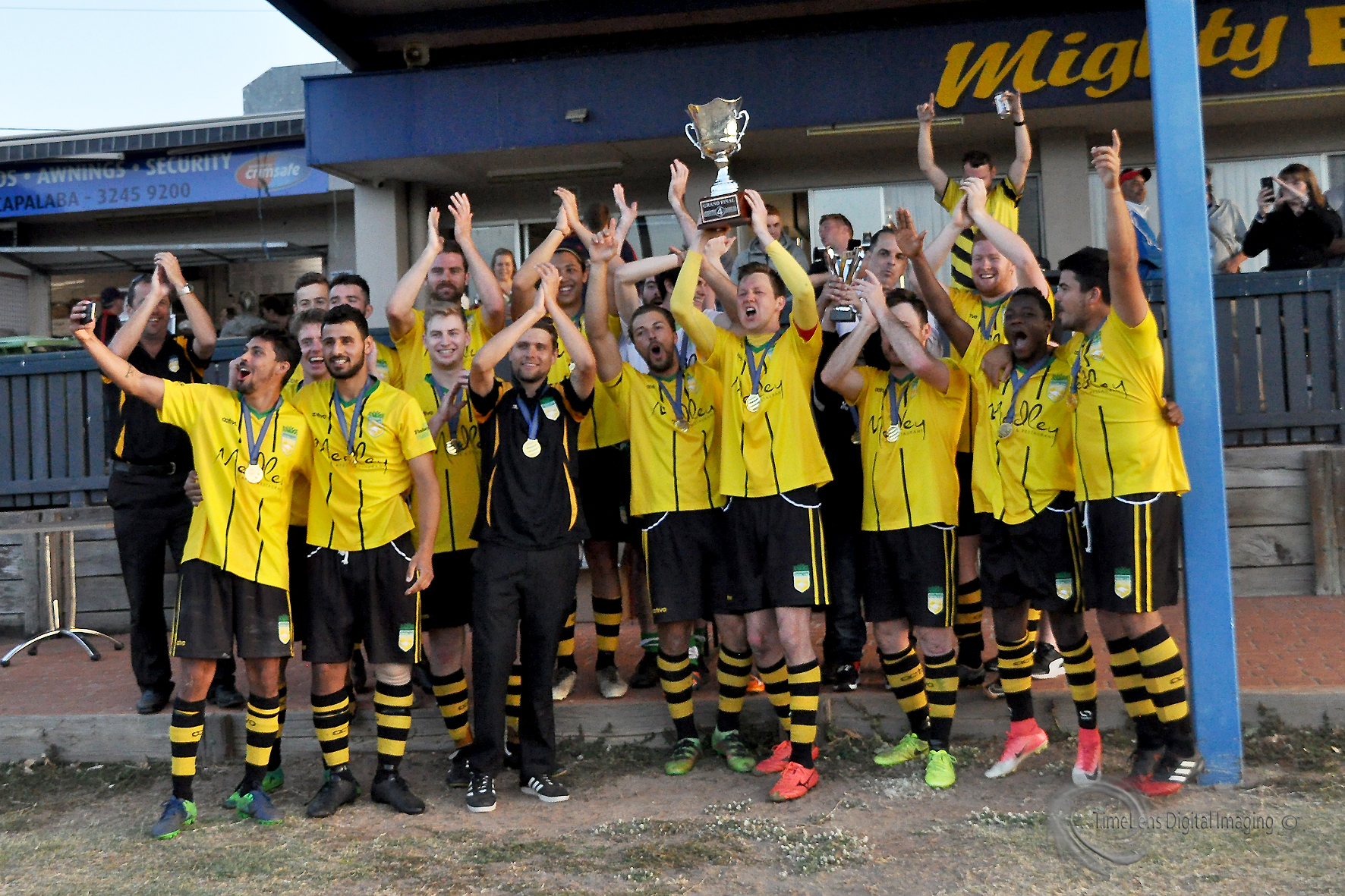
The Capital 4 Grand Final winning squad.

== Honours ==
- Brisbane Division 3
  - Champions: 2002
- Brisbane Metro League 1
  - Champions: 2006
- Capital League 2/Football Queensland Premier League 5 − Metro
  - Champions: 2023
- Capital League 3
  - Premiers: 2013
  - Champions: 2013
- Capital League 4
  - Champions: 2017

== Recent seasons ==
Season	League											FFA Cup
Season	Division (tier)	Pld	W	D	L	GF	GA	GD	Pts	Position	Finals Series	FFA Cup
2008	Premier Division 2 (5)	22	7	3	12	29	44	-15	24	9th	DNQ	Not yet founded
2009	Premier Division 2 (5)	22	6	8	8	48	54	-6	26	9th	DNQ	Not yet founded
2010	Premier Division 2 (5)	22	6	2	14	33	66	-33	20	9th	DNQ	Not yet founded
2011	Premier Division 2 (5)	26	7	3	16	26	56	-30	24	12th	DNQ	Not yet founded
2012	Premier Division 2 (5)	22	2	2	18	29	84	-55	8	12th ↓	DNQ	Not yet founded
2013	Capital League 3 (6)	20	16	1	3	92	23	69	49	1st ↑	Champions	Not yet founded
2014	Capital League 2 (5)	22	4	2	16	26	68	-42	14	10th ↓	DNQ	Preliminary Round 4
2015	Capital League 3 (6)	22	5	0	17	29	64	-35	15	11th ↓	DNQ	Preliminary Round 2
2016	Capital League 4 (7)	24	9	2	13	43	65	-22	29	8th	DNQ	Preliminary Round 2
2017	Capital League 4 (7)	16	12	1	3	39	13	26	37	3rd	Champions	Preliminary Round 2
2018	Capital League 2 (6)	20	7	3	10	37	51	-14	24	8th	DNQ	Preliminary Round 2
2019	Capital League 2 (6)	22	11	6	5	38	35	3	39	4th	Preliminary Final	Preliminary Round 3

Key:	Premiers / Champions	Promoted ↑	Relegated ↓

The tier is the level in the Australian soccer league system
