= Albany Creek Excelsior FC =

Moreton City Excelsior Reserves (FQLD)
- Full name: Moreton City Excelsior Football Club Reserves
- Founded: 1963
- Ground: Wolter Park, Albany Creek
- Manager: Steve Glockner
- League: FQPL 2
- 2025: 3rd of 12
- Website: https://www.moretoncityexcelsiorfc.com/

Moreton City Excelsior FC Reserves (formerly Albany Creek Excelsior FC) is an Australian football (soccer) club from Albany Creek, a suburb of Brisbane, Queensland, Australia. The club was formed in 1963, and currently play in Brisbane Premier League.

== History ==
Albany Creek Excelsior Football Club was founded in 1963 by Hec Wolter, the headmaster of Albany Creek Primary School. The early years of the club focussed on providing teams for Brisbane's junior soccer competitions, with an emphasis on the development of local junior players.

The club is first recorded as competing in senior competition in 1977 when it played in Brisbane's Division Seven. The club slowly rose up the ranks and was promoted to Division Two after winning the 1995 Division Three Grand Final against Capalaba. For the next 14 seasons from 1996 to 2009, Albany Creek Excelsior remained at the second tier of Brisbane competition, just one level below the Brisbane Premier League.

After relegation in 2009, a season when the club failed to win a game, Albany Creek Excelsior bounced back and narrowly missed promotion in 2010 Premier League Two, and achieved the best cup run in their history by reaching the semi-finals of the 2010 Brisbane Premier Cup before being knocked out by Rochedale Rovers.

Between 2007 and 2011, the club was able to invest heavily in infrastructure at Wolter Park and the South Pine Sports Complex, thanks to generous donations from supporters of the club together with government financial support. These investments contributed to the club being promoted to the Brisbane Premier League for the first time in 2013, and its associated club Moreton City Excelsior FC being selected into the National Premier Leagues Queensland. The Moreton City Excelsior FC NPL share with Moreton City Excelsior FC Reserves FQLD a home ground at Wolter Park, Albany Creek.

Albany Creek secured their first Brisbane Premier League Premiership in 2018. They would fall short of the Championship to Grange Thistle losing 5–1 in the grand final. In 2019, Albany Creek would complete the double winning both the Brisbane Premier League Premiership with 52 points and the Championship beating Toowong FC 2–0 in the grand final. In 2022, Albany Creek were promoted to FQPL 2 after winning the 2021 FQPL 3 – Metro Premiership. In 2023, Albany Creek were promoted to FQPL after finishing 2nd in the 2022 FQPL 2 .

== Current squad ==
As of 14 June 2022

Note: Flags indicate national team as defined under FIFA eligibility rules; some limited exceptions apply. Players may hold more than one non-FIFA nationality.

No.	Pos.	Nation	Player
1	GK	AUS	Harrison Royley
2	DF	AUS	Jay Brindell-South
3	DF	AUS	Louis Irish
4	DF	AUS	Sean Lewis
5	MF	JPN	Yuya Ono
6	MF	AUS	Steven Snaith
7	MF	AUS	Ryan Shaughnessy
8	MF	AUS	Joshua Masters
9	FW	AUS	Alistair Russell
10	FW	AUS	Carter Glockner

No.	Pos.	Nation	Player
11	MF	AUS	Liam Brown
12	MF	AUS	Dylan Moore
14	MF	AUS	Matthew Fox
15	MF	AUS	Nicholas Clark
16	MF	AUS	Jarod Lancaster
19	MF	AUS	Ben Hering
21	FW	AUS	Matthew Sanchez
21	DF	AUS	Caleb Patterson

== Recent Seasons ==
Season	League											FFA Cup
Season	Division (tier)	Pld	W	D	L	GF	GA	GD	Pts	Position	Finals Series	FFA Cup
2008	Premier Division 1 (4)	22	3	2	17	20	67	−47	11	12th	DNQ	Not yet founded
2009	Premier Division 1 (4)	22	0	2	20	13	73	−60	2	12th ↓	DNQ	Not yet founded
2010	Premier Division 2 (5)	22	14	2	6	61	33	28	44	3rd	Runners-up	Not yet founded
2011	Premier Division 2 (5)	26	14	5	7	72	32	40	47	2nd ↑	Champions	Not yet founded
2012	Premier Division 1 (4)	26	17	4	5	74	48	26	55	1st ↑	Semi-Finalist	Not yet founded
2013	Brisbane Premier League (3)	22	7	0	15	32	67	−35	21	9th	DNQ	Not yet founded
2014	Brisbane Premier League (3)	22	7	1	14	35	56	−21	22	8th	DNQ	Preliminary Round 3
2015	Brisbane Premier League (3)	22	9	5	8	42	34	8	32	6th	DNQ	Preliminary Round 5
2016	Brisbane Premier League (3)	22	9	5	8	44	37	7	32	8th	DNQ	Preliminary Round 4
2017	Brisbane Premier League (3)	22	9	5	8	42	38	4	32	5th	DNQ	Preliminary Round 5
2018	Brisbane Premier League (4)	22	15	6	1	53	23	30	51	1st	Runners-up	Preliminary Round 4
2019	Brisbane Premier League (4)	22	16	4	2	63	20	43	52	1st	Champions	Preliminary Round 4
2020*	Brisbane Premier League* (4)	16	12	1	3	51	21	30	37	2nd	No Finals Series*	Suspended*
2021	FQPL 3 – Metro (4)	22	19	3	0	102	19	84	60	1st	Runners-up	Preliminary Round 4

Key:	Premiers / Champions	Promoted ↑	Relegated ↓

* Shortened season due to COVID-19 pandemic
The tier is the level in the Australian soccer league system

== Honours ==
- FQPL 3 − Metro / Brisbane Premier League
  - Premiership
    - Winners (3): 2018, 2019, 2021
  - Championship
    - Winners (1): 2019
- Brisbane Premier Division 1
  - Premiership
    - Winners (1): 2012
- Brisbane Premier Division 2
  - Championship
    - Winners (1): 2011
- Brisbane Division 1 North
  - Championship
    - Winners (1): 1998
- Brisbane Division 3
  - Championship
    - Winners (1): 1995
- Brisbane Division 4
  - Premiership
    - Winners (1): 1990

== See also ==
- Moreton City Excelsior FC (NPL)
