= Bayside United FC =

- Full name: Bayside United Football Club
- Founded: 1974
- Ground: Don Randall Oval, Lota
- League: FQPL 3 – Metro
- 2024: 12th of 12, (Relegated); FQPL 4 – Metro
- Website: http://www.baysideunited.com.au/

Bayside United FC is an Australian football (soccer) club from Lota, an eastern suburb of Brisbane. The club was formed in 1974, and currently competes in FQPL 3 Metro. When the club celebrated its 40th anniversary in 2014 it had over 500 members and more than 440 registered junior players.

== History ==
The Lota Recreation Club in 1954 was started by Horrie Stephens and Bert Taylor who coached the Lota State School football teams in 1953, which gave them the idea of starting a sporting club at Cox Park. The idea of starting the club as also in conjunction with other locals Arthur Lachlan, George Parsons and Alan Cronshaw. The team colours of Gold & Black were from English football club Wolverhampton Wanderers, with written permission having to be sought to use them. The club also offered Netball and Badminton at the time.

Bayside United FC was formed in 1974, arising out of the Bayside United Sports and Recreation Club which had been providing local children with the chance to play organised sports, including soccer since 1954. In the early 1970s, the local PCYC took over the running of all the sports other than soccer which remained with the sports club and was renamed the Wondall United Soccer Club until 1973. Bayside United FC built upon these beginnings after its establishment in 1974, expanding the club so that it was able to join the mainstream Brisbane soccer competitions.

For its first ten years, Bayside United played at Cox Park in Richard Street, Lota. The club moved to its current home at Don Randall Oval, Lota in 1984.

Bayside United’s first recorded season at senior level was in 1977 when the club finished second and achieved promotion from Brisbane’s Division Six. The club rose through the divisions to Division Two in 1983, but was relegated after a single season. By 1989, the club was back in Division Six, but won its first premiership the following season, achieving 16 wins from 20 matches. Since 1990 Bayside United has slowly risen through the divisions, being relegated just once in 1999.

Between 2003 and 2007, Bayside United spent five seasons in Metro League Division One, the fourth tier of Brisbane football. The club lost grand finals against Souths United in both 2005 and 2007, and finished second in 2006 but were suspended from the finals series. Bayside United won Metro League Division One in 2007 with 16 wins, 2 draws and 2 losses from 20 games and were promoted to Premier Division Two.

Five seasons in Premier Division Two culminated in winning the minor premiership and promotion in 2012, which coach Ben Ryan said achieved the club’s priority for the season. The club was still disappointed to lose another grand final, this time in a penalty shoot-out to Annerley. The club’s Premier Division Two reserves team did win the double in 2012, winning the premiership, and the grand final 3-1 against Holland Park Hawks FC .

In 2013, the club finished runners-up in Capital League 1 to the undefeated Mitchelton team, and in a normal season would have been promoted to the Brisbane Premier League, however there was no promotion for this season only, and Bayside United missed the chance to play in the top flight of Brisbane football for the first time. In 2014, Bayside United finished third and lost another grand final on penalties, this time to Taringa Rovers .

Bayside United remain in Capital League 1 after they finished 10th in 2015 and avoided relegation by five points, and then achieved a mid-table finish in 2016.

Bayside United currently compete in Football Queensland Premier League 3 - Metro as of 2021. Bayside won the FQPL3 Grand Final in 2021 beating Albany Creek Excelsior on penalties.

== Recent seasons ==
Season	League											FFA Cup
Season	Division (tier)	Pld	W	D	L	GF	GA	GD	Pts	Position	Finals Series	FFA Cup
2008	Premier Division 2 (5)	22	7	8	7	36	40	-4	29	7th	DNQ	Not yet founded
2009	Premier Division 2 (5)	22	7	6	9	26	33	-7	27	7th	DNQ	Not yet founded
2010	Premier Division 2 (5)	22	6	4	12	33	46	-13	22	8th	DNQ	Not yet founded
2011	Premier Division 2 (5)	26	10	4	12	46	55	-9	34	11th	DNQ	Not yet founded
2012	Premier Division 2 (5)	22	18	2	2	76	20	56	56	1st ↑	Runners-up	Not yet founded
2013	Capital League 1 (4)	22	13	4	5	54	37	17	43	2nd	Semi-Finalist	Not yet founded
2014	Capital League 1 (4)	22	13	4	5	56	30	26	43	3rd	Runners-up	Preliminary Round 3
2015	Capital League 1 (4)	21	5	7	9	21	38	-17	22	10th	DNQ	Preliminary Round 5
2016	Capital League 1 (4)	22	12	0	10	44	27	17	36	5th	DNQ	Preliminary Round 3
2017	Capital League 1 (4)	22	10	4	8	40	35	5	34	6th	DNQ	Preliminary Round 3
2019	Brisbane Premier League	11	8	2	1	36	16	20	26	3rd		

Key:	Premiers / Champions	Promoted ↑	Relegated ↓

The tier is the level in the Australian soccer league system

== Current squad ==
Note: Flags indicate national team as defined under FIFA eligibility rules; some limited exceptions apply. Players may hold more than one non-FIFA nationality.

No.	Pos.	Nation	Player
1	GK	AUS	Connor Jones
2	DF	AUS	Joel McManagan
3	DF	AUS	Luca Mazza
4	DF	AUS	Blake O'Brien
6	DF	AUS	Billy Theodore
8	MF	SCO	Jonny Mathers
9	FW	AUS	Tom Sparksman
10	MF	AUS	Tristan Leek
11	MF	AUS	Luke Hendrix

No.	Pos.	Nation	Player
13	MF	ENG	Jamie Dibbs
14	DF	KOR	Giyun Ryu
15	MF	SCO	Stephen McDonald
16	DF	ENG	Adam Street
18	FW	AUS	Connor Askew
19	FW	JPN	Towa Tomita
21	GK	AUS	Cameron Weir
23	FW	AUS	Bailey Johnson

=== Technical staff ===
Position	Name
Head coach	Deric Woodford
Assistant coach	Rob McLauchlan
Assistant coach	Jeffrey Harris

== Honours ==
- Brisbane Division 6 – Premiers 1990
- Metro League Division 1 – Premiers 2007
- Premier Division 2 – Premiers 2012
- Brisbane Premier League - Champions 2021
- FQPL3 Grand Final Runners-Up 2022

Brisbane Metro Cup winners 2007
