= Caboolture Sports FC =

Australian football club

- Full name: Caboolture Sports Football Club
- Nickname: Mighty Snakes
- Founded: 1969; 57 years ago as St Michael’s Soccer Club
- Ground: Moreton Bay Central Sports Complex
- Capacity: 8,000
- Coach: Terry Kirkham
- League: FQPL
- 2026: 6th of 12
- Website: https://www.caboolturesportsfc.com.au/
Home colours	Away colours

Caboolture Sports Football Club is a semi-professional football club based in Burpengary, Queensland, Australia. Caboolture Sports plays in the Football Queensland Premier League, the second flight of Queensland football, following promotion from the third flight after winning the 2021 premiership. The club has a senior men, senior women and a variety of academy teams competing in Queensland competitions.

The club is based at the Moreton Bay Central Sports Complex and teams playing for the club are nicknamed the Mighty Snakes. Caboolture Sports FC have won a host of regional competitions within Brisbane, earning promotion throughout the region's competitions. The club's most notable achievement was the 2021 FQPL 2 premiership, being the competition's inaugural winners.

== History ==
In 1969, Father Francis of Saint Michael's Church in Caboolture established a soccer club under the name St Michael's Soccer Club. The home ground of the club was located at Centenary Lakes fields with the club fielding approximately 35 teams within age brackets from under-7s to a senior men's team, competing within the Brisbane North Junior Soccer Association. Following the club's move to the Grant Road sporting complex, the club changed its name to Caboolture Soccer Club, still competing with local teams.

In 1996, Caboolture soccer club left the Brisbane North Junior Soccer Association to join the new Queensland Soccer's Sunshine Coast Football to better suit the club's location and in 1997, the club was renamed to Caboolture Sports Soccer Club, bringing together a partnership with five other sports to keep the club afloat financially.

Following the spell with Sunshine Coast football, the club again left its zone to join another, becoming a part of Football Brisbane (today known as Football Metro) in 2016, fielding 51 teams across nearly all divisions, with the senior team joining the Football Brisbane Capital League 4. In 2019, the club relocated to the Moreton Bay Central Sports Complex in Burpengary with a state of the art synthetic field. In the same year, the club recorded upwards of 70 teams across all age groups. In March 2020, Caboolture Sports closed in response to the COVID-19 pandemic with Football Metro temporarily suspending all competitions.

Caboolture Sports' application to join as one of the 8 teams of the inaugural season of the Football Queensland Premier League 2 was successful in 2020, with the first season starting in 2021. The league would be the first third-tier state-wide football competition across Queensland. The club would go on to win the inaugural FQPL 2 premiership and place as runner-ups against Grange Thistle in the championship final after a 3-1 defeat at AJ Kelly park. This successful run through the league winning 15 out of 21 matches would see Caboolture Sports enter the Football Queensland Premier League for the 2022 season.

On 5 March 2022, Caboolture Sports played the Solomon Islands national football team in an unofficial friendly organised by Football Queensland in preparation for their 2022 FIFA World Cup qualifying campaign. Caboolture Sports won the match winning 2−1 at the Moreton Bay Central Sports Complex. The Solomon Islands' coach, Felipe Vega-Arango, received criticism from Solomon Islander media following the defeat to an Australian third-tier side.

== Recent Seasons ==
=== Men's Senior Team ===
Season	League											Australia Cup	Ref.
Season	Division (tier)	Pld	W	D	L	GF	GA	GD	Pts	Position	Finals Series	Australia Cup	Ref.
2016	Football Brisbane Capital League 4 (8)	24	21	2	1	170	21	149	65	2nd ↑	Champions	Preliminary Round 2	
2017	Football Brisbane Capital League 3 (7)	22	15	2	5	85	42	43	47	2nd ↑↑	Champions	Preliminary Round 2	
2018	Football Brisbane Capital League 1 (5)	22	18	3	1	76	14	62	57	1st ↑	Semi-finals	Preliminary Round 4	
2019	Brisbane Premier League (4)	22	10	1	11	49	46	3	31	5th	DNQ	Preliminary Round 4	
2020	Brisbane Premier League (4)	11	2	0	9	13	14	-27	6	11th	DNQ	Preliminary Round 2	
2021	FQPL 2 (4)	21	15	2	4	73	20	53	47	1st ↑	Runner-up	Preliminary Round 3	
2022	FQPL (3)	20	6	3	11	38	58	−20	21	9th	DNQ	Preliminary Round 5	

Key:	Premiers / Champions	Promoted ↑	Relegated ↓

The tier in the above table is the level in the Australian soccer league system, Source

== Honours ==
As of 1 January 2022

=== Football Queensland ===
- Football Queensland Premier League 2 (third tier)

- Premiership
  - Winners (1) (record): 2021

=== Football Metro ===
- Football Metro Capital League 1 (second tier)

- Premiership
  - Winners (1): 2018

- Football Metro Capital League 3 (fourth tier)

- Championship
  - Winners (1): 2017

- Football Metro Capital League 4 (fifth tier)

- Championship
  - Winners (1): 2016
