= Holland Park Hawks FC =

- Full name: Holland Park Hawks Football Club
- Nickname: Hawks or Hawkies
- Founded: 1977
- Ground: Whites Hill Reserve; Camp Hill
- Head coach: Luke DeVere
- League: Football Queensland Premier League 1
- 2024: Football Queensland Premier League 2 1st of 12 (Promoted)
- Website: https://hphawksfc.com.au/
Home colours	Away colours

Holland Park Hawks FC is a football club based in Camp Hill, Queensland. They will be competing in the Football Queensland Premier League, the 3rd division on the football pyramid of Australia, after achieving promotion from Football Queensland Premier League 2 in 2024. The club has youth teams which also compete in Football Queensland Academy Leagues which starts at U9 and ends at U18's.

== History ==
Holland Park Hawks Football Club was formed in 1976 with its home ground located at Whites Hill Reserve in Camp Hill. The club spent the 1980s and 1990s playing in the Church League until entering Football Brisbane competition in 2008 and achieving promotion by finishing top of the Metro League Division Two table in their first season.

Further promotions occurred in 2010, 2014 and 2015 enabling the club to climb from fifth tier of the Football Brisbane structure to the first tier in just eight seasons. Holland Park Hawks won each of these promotions by topping the league table to become premiers, and were champions three time after grand final victories. The three grand final wins were:

- 2010 Metro League Division 1: Won 2–1 vs. Ridge Hills United
- 2014 Capital League 2: Won 3–2 vs. Park Ridge
- 2015 Capital League 1: Won 3–0 vs. North Pine

In 2010, Holland Park Hawks also had cup success, winning the Metro Cup competition (also known as the Veto Cup) after beating Souths United 2–1 in the Final.

Holland Park Hawks FC had a successful debut in the 2016 Brisbane Premier League season, finishing in third place on the league table and qualifying for the finals series in which they reached the preliminary final.

To build upon its success, the club applied to be part of the new National Premier Leagues structure which will commence in the 2018 season. In May 2017, Football Queensland announced Holland Park Hawks were among the 14 clubs accepted to form the Football Queensland Premier League for its initial season in 2018.

In their first season in the Football Queensland Premier League 1 (FQPL 1), the Hawks finished 10th out of the 13 teams in the competition. 3 years later though, in the 2021 season, they finished 10th out of 11, relegating them to Football Queensland Premier League 2 (FQPL 2).

In late 2022, club Technical Director, Gabriel Hawash was appointed as the Head Coach for the senior team. In the 2024 season, Hawash's second in charge, Hawks were premiers of FQPL2, winning the league and achieving promotion back to FQPL1. Hawks lost just one league game and amassed a total of 57 points over the season, which was at the time the equal highest ever points tally in a single season in FQPL2, tied with Broadbeach United S.C. who achieved the same points in the previous season. Holland Park's #9 Connor McAuley scored 23 league goals and was awarded the league's golden boot in this season, achieving the third highest individual goal tally ever in a single FQPL 2 season.

== Academy ==
'Hawks' Has long prided itself on its youth academy. The club's most successful academy product is Abrahim Yango who went on to play in the A-League Men with Brisbane Roar FC.The academy has improved further since the academy teams moved away from the Football Brisbane competitions and moved into the Football Queensland Competitions, alongside the senior mens side being moved into FQPL1, in 2017.

Throughout the clubs time in what is now known as the Football Queensland Academy Leagues, the Academy teams have remained in the 2nd tier of Academy football in Queensland, although in years 2023-2026 the club has received rankings of 11th placed academy in Football Queensland, existing at the top of 'League 2'.

Particularly since the Appointment of TD Gabriel Hawash, the academy has gone from strength to strength, with numerous academy products going on to play for the senior mens side and the aforementioned consistency in the Football Queensland Academy club rankings.

The club's academy won its first trophy since moving to Football Queensland competitions in 2025 when the U18s won the U18 Football Queensland Academy League 2 Grand Final. Beating Magic United 2-0. That year's Hawks U18 team was a testamant to the quality of the club's modern academy, consisting of many players who had been at the club for many years and included three players who had scored for the senior mens team that season, one whom, Aiden Sun, was only 15 years old at the time of scoring his first senior goal.

== Players ==
=== First team squad ===
As of 8 December 2025

Note: Flags indicate national team as defined under FIFA eligibility rules; some limited exceptions apply. Players may hold more than one non-FIFA nationality.

No.	Pos.	Nation	Player
2	DF	AUS	Martin Sandry
7	FW	AUS	Hunter Rutty
11	MF	AUS	Kyle Wieser
15	MF	IRL	Connor Doorman
18	MF	COL	Juan Esteban Aristizabal
19	DF	AUS	Motoki Kuzuyama
—	FW	AUS	Ben Mcdonnell
—	MF	AUS	Huon Seelig
—	GK	AUS	Jake Watson-Roddy
—	MF	AUS	Ryan Oostenbroek
—	MF	KOR	Jason Park
—	GK	AUS	Josh Leporati
—	DF	AUS	Alex Crocker

== Club officials ==
=== Board ===
Position	Name
President	(England) Sharon Flannery
Vice-president	(Australia) Nigel Hemer
Treasurer	Stefan Keller
Committee Member	Lee Sawyer
Committee Member	Gary Wier
Committee Member	Chris Allmond

=== Staff members ===
Position	Name
Football Director (FD)	
Academy Leads	Alex Accini & Liam Murphy
Office Manager	Ivana Barozzi
Female Football Director	Liam Murphy

=== Senior team staff ===
Position	Name
Head coach	Luke DeVere
Assistant Coach	Jack Mestric
Assistant Coach	Alex Accini
Physio	Ajay Khabra
Goalkeeper Coach	Sam Flannery

== Seasons ==
Season	League											FFA Cup
Season	Division (tier)	Pld	W	D	L	GF	GA	GD	Pts	Position	Finals Series	FFA Cup
2008	Metro League 2 (7)	22	17	1	4	74	22	52	52	1st ↑	Semi-final	Not yet founded
2009	Metro League 1 (6)	20	8	1	11	45	44	1	25	6th	DNQ	Not yet founded
2010	Metro League 1 (6)	21	13	1	7	50	34	16	40	1st ↑	Champions	Not yet founded
2011	Premier Division 2 (5)	26	13	6	7	58	39	19	45	3rd	Preliminary Final	Not yet founded
2012	Premier Division 2 (5)	22	14	3	5	47	23	24	45	3rd	Semi-final	Not yet founded
2013	Capital League 2 (5)	22	10	6	6	60	37	23	36	6th	DNQ	Not yet founded
2014	Capital League 2 (5)	22	17	1	4	91	27	64	52	1st ↑	Champions	Preliminary Round 4
2015	Capital League 1 (4)	21	15	4	2	69	25	44	49	1st ↑	Champions	Preliminary Round 3
2016	Brisbane Premier League (3)	22	12	3	7	51	34	17	39	3rd	Preliminary Final	Preliminary Round 4
2017	Brisbane Premier League (3)	22	8	6	8	56	45	11	30	7th	DNQ	Preliminary Round 6
2018	Football Queensland Premier League (3)	24	8	1	15	53	69	-16	25	10th	DNQ	Preliminary Round 4
2019	Football Queensland Premier League (3)	18	3	1	14	31	70	-39	10	10th	DNQ	Preliminary Round 6
2020	Football Queensland Premier League (3)	20	3	4	13	24	45	-21	13	9th	DNQ	COVID-19 pandemic
2021	Football Queensland Premier League 1 (3)	20	3	3	14	29	54	-29	12	10th	DNQ	Prelimiminary Round 6
2022	Football Queensland Premier League 2 (4)	22	9	4	9	51	44	+7	31	5th	DNQ	Preliminary Round 4
2024	Football Queensland Premier League 2 (4)	22	18	3	1	69	28	41	58	1st	Runners Up	Preliminary Round 4
2025	Football Queensland Premier League 1 (3)	22	8	3	11	47	46	1	27	8th	DNQ	Preliminary Round 4

Key:	Premiers / Champions	Promoted ↑	Relegated ↓

The tier is the level in the Australian soccer league system

== Honours ==
- FQPL 3 Metro Women's – Premiers 2024
- Football Queensland Premier League 2- Premiers 2024
- Capital League 1 – Premiers and Champions 2015
- Capital League 2 – Premiers and Champions 2014
- Metro League 1 – Premiers and Champions 2010
- Metro Cup – Winner 2010
- Metro League 2 – Premiers 2008
