= Annerley FC =

Annerley Football Club
- Full name: Annerley Football Club
- Founded: 1945
- Ground: Elder Oval, Greenslopes
- League: Football Queensland Premier League – Metro; FQPL 4 WFQPL 2
- Website: http://www.annerleyfc.com/

Annerley FC is an Australian football (soccer) club from the area bordering Greenslopes

== History ==
Annerley FC was established in 1945 and was first known as the Annerley Boomerangs before being renamed the Annerley Stars Soccer Club and initially playing at the grounds of the Junction Park State School. The club moved their headquarters in 1946 to an area of Ekibin Park south of Ridge Street after successfully applying to the Brisbane City Council for a grant of land. The club's grounds were able to expand to the section of Ekibin Park between Juliette Street and Ridge Street, including the site of Elder Oval, when the nearby Southeast Freeway was constructed in the 1970s.

Annerley FC initially played in the Brisbane junior competition before transferring to senior football in 1949, commencing in Division Five. The club remained in the lower divisions of Brisbane football until they won consecutive promotions in 1954, 1955 and 1956 to rise from Brisbane's Division Four to Division One in three seasons. The club established itself in Division One with mid-table finishes in 1957 and 1958.

The 1959 season proved the most successful in the club's history, winning Division One with equal points but a better goal average than Oxley United. Annerley confirmed they were Brisbane's champion team in 1959 with a 5-4 grand final win against Hellenic, this being the first season in which the final series was held to decide Brisbane soccer's champion club. Annerley's success was built around a mix of rising young players and experienced internationals including Graham McMillan and Malcolm Wild who both represented Australia during the 1950s.

Annerley FC had another good season in 1960, finishing runners-up in Division One, but then lost players prior to the 1961 season to the emerging ethnic clubs including Hellenic and Polonia. When the Queensland Soccer Federation was formed in 1962, Annerley decided to remain with the Brisbane & Ipswich Soccer Football Association. It won the association Division One title in spectacular style going 24 matches undefeated, but lost the final of the Tristram Shield 3–2 to Hollandia in extra time. After the 1963 season, Annerley joined QSF's Division Two which was expanded from 8 to 12 teams in 1964 to include clubs from the association which had disbanded. Annerley remained in Division Two for a decade until winning the title and promotion to Division One in 1973.

In 1977, with Brisbane's top two clubs Brisbane Lions and Brisbane City joining the first season of the NSL, Annerley finished third in Division One. This qualified them for the national cup competition, the 1978 NSL Cup in which they were knocked out after a first round heavy defeat to Brisbane Lions.

Since 1983, Annerley has competed in more seasons at the third tier of Brisbane football than any other club (25 seasons, up to 2016), and also been premiers the most times at this level (4 premiership titles, in 1984, 1990, 1998 and 2013). The club has also won four grand finals during this period, the latest being a 5-4 penalty shoot-out victory over Bayside United after a 3–3 draw in the 2012 Premier Division Two grand final.

In 2019, the Mens City League 6 Team, the Axis of Evil completed the season unbeaten in both the league and the finals series achieving a Premiership and Championship double, only conceding 12 goals in their 20 game undefeated run.

== Honours ==
Due to frequent restructures and re-classifications of divisions in Brisbane football, the club’s first team honours below are listed by tier in the Brisbane football pyramid.

Tier 1

- Brisbane Division 1 – Premiers and Champions 1959

Tier 2

- Brisbane Division 2 – Premiers 1956
- Brisbane Division 2 – Premiers 1973

Tier 3

- Brisbane & Ipswich Soccer Football Association Division 1 - 1962
- Brisbane Division 1 – Premiers and Champions 1984
- Brisbane Division 3 – Premiers 1990
- Brisbane Division 1 – Champions 1997
- Brisbane Division 1 – Premiers 1998
- Brisbane Division 2 – Premiers 2001
- Premier Division 2 – Champions 2012
- Capital League 2 – Champions 2013

Tier 4

- Metro League Division 1 – Premiers 2008
