= Ipswich Knights FC =

Ipswich Knights
- Full name: Ipswich Knights Soccer Club
- Nickname: Knights
- Founded: 1998
- Ground: Eric Evans Reserve; Stan McCrea Oval
- Chairman: Troy Beahan
- Head Coaches: Andrew Ogden, Lucas Wilson
- League: FQPL 3 – Metro
- 2025: 4th of 13
- Website: https://www.ipswichknights.org.au/wspHome.aspx
Home colours

Ipswich Knights Football Club is an Australian football club from Ipswich, Queensland.

The Ipswich Knights were formed in 1998 and was an amalgamation of two Ipswich clubs, the Bundamba-based "Coalstars" and the Ebbw Vale-based "St Helens United". Ipswich Knights currently play in the Football Queensland Premier League 3 – Metro.

== History ==
Ipswich Knights was formed in 1998, with the amalgamation of two existing Ipswich clubs, Coalstars (formerly based at Bundamba) and St Helens United (formerly based at Ebbw Vale).

The Coalstars club had been formed in 1964 through the amalgamation of two of the oldest football clubs in the local region, Blackstone Rovers (1888) and Bundamba Rangers (1894). St Helens United was formed in 1966, through the amalgamation of the original St Helens club (1910) with Redbank, who had previously merged with one of the most successful clubs in local football, the Dinmore Bush Rats, originally called New Chum Bush Rats (1891).

These Ipswich clubs had produced many talented players, including Col and Spencer Kitching, Cliff Sander, Al Warren, Duncan McKenna, Graham Kruger, Ross Kelly, Graham Kathage, Les Keith and Stanley McCrea, Chris Brown, Brian Vogler and Ian Johnston, some of whom had represented both Queensland and Australia. However, the rise of wealthy ethnic clubs in Brisbane during the 1950s and 1960s lured many of the top players to Brisbane, thereby weakening the Ipswich clubs.
