= Capalaba FC =

- Full name: Capalaba Football Club
- Nickname: The Bulldogs
- Short name: CFC
- Founded: 1972
- Ground: John Fredericks Park
- Head coach: Danny Gnjidic
- League: FQPL
- 2025: 10th of 12
- Website: http://www.capalababulldogs.com/

Capalaba Football Club (formerly the Capalaba Bulldogs Soccer Club) is a semi-professional Australian soccer club based in Capalaba, Queensland, a suburb of Brisbane, who plays in the National Premier Leagues Queensland.

== History ==
The Capalaba Football Club is home of the mighty 'Bulldogs' and is located at John Fredericks Park (also known as Sam Sciacca Sportsfield) on Old Cleveland Road, Capalaba, approximately twenty one kilometres south-east of Brisbane.

The Club was formed in 1972 and is a football (soccer) club catering for all ages and skill level from the very youngest to the most senior members of the Community.

Capalaba FC competes at the elite football level through participation in the Football Queensland Premier Leagues (FQPL) and the National Premier Leagues Women's (NPLW).

Capalaba FC also fields teams in Football Queensland’s Community, Metro League, Masters and Legends competitions.

To cater for the younger age groups, Capalaba FC provides opportunities through its Kick-off (4 to 9 years), Mini-roos (6 to 12 years) and juniors (under 13 to under 16 years).

They have four full-sized playing fields, two half-sized fields and up to five small-sided fields.

The club has a licensed clubhouse, canteen, football merchandise shop, hall for hire and parking.

== Home ground ==
The club plays out of John Fredericks Park on Old Cleveland Road Capalaba.

== Club Officials ==
Current Personnel:

NPLW
Position	Name
Technical Director	David Booth & Lee Walker
Head Coach	Chris Shepley
Assistant Coach	Ken Roberts

FQPL 1 Men's
Position	Name
Head Coach	Danny Gnjidic
Assistant Coach	Mitch Sutherland
u23 Head Coach	Jordan Good
u23 Assistant Coach	Zak Meuli

== Current squad ==
Note: Flags indicate national team as defined under FIFA eligibility rules; some limited exceptions apply. Players may hold more than one non-FIFA nationality.

No.	Pos.	Nation	Player
1	GK	AUS	Michael Weier
3	DF	AUS	Jack Boxell (C)
4	DF	AUS	Sam Langley
5	MF	AUS	Liam O’Bryan
6	MF	AUS	Noah Hitchcock
7	MF	AUS	Connor Booth
9	FW	JPN	Ono Ryo
11	FW	AUS	Alexander Warrilow
12	FW	AUS	Hayden Ibrahim
13	MF	AUS	Harrison Turner

No.	Pos.	Nation	Player
14	MF	AUS	Stuart Edgar
15	MF	AUS	Luke Hendrix
16	DF	AUS	Ryan Hughes
17	MF	AUS	Ryan Cokell
18	MF	AUS	Cristian Carbone
19	MF	AUS	Scot Coulson
20	DF	AUS	Nicholas Robinson
21	GK	AUS	Lucas Priaulx
