= South West Queensland Thunder FC =

South West Queensland Thunder
- Full name: South West Queensland Thunder Football Club
- Nickname: Thunder
- Founded: 2012
- Ground: Clive Berghofer Stadium
- Website: www.swqthunder.com.au
| Home colours | Away colours |

The South West Queensland Thunder Football Club is an association football club based in Toowoomba, Queensland. Its senior teams currently compete in Football Queensland Premier League 2, the third tier of football in Queensland.

The club was established in 2012, and play their home senior fixtures at Clive Berghofer Stadium. Its junior teams compete in the Football Queensland Academy Leagues.

In the 2025 season, both the men’s and women’s senior teams competed in FQPL1. The men’s team finished 11th out of 12 teams, and the women’s team finished 9th out of 10 teams. As a result, both the men’s and women’s teams were relegated to FQPL2 for the 2026 season.

== Home ground ==
Clive Berghofer Stadium is a rectangular football stadium in Toowoomba, Queensland, situated on Mary Street on the eastern fringes of the Toowoomba CBD adjacent to Queens Park and Toowoomba East State School.

Formerly known as Athletic Oval, the stadium was renamed to reflect the home club's major sponsor, philanthropist property developer and former local Mayor Clive Berghofer.

The ground plays host to rugby league, rugby union and football fixtures.

The grandstand includes undercover seating for 2,300.
