= Capital League =

- Founded: 2013; 13 years ago
- Folded: 2021; 5 years ago
- Country: Australia
- State: Queensland
- Number of clubs: 12
- Level on pyramid: 6–8
- Domestic cup(s): National; Australia Cup; Regional; Canale Cup
- Last champions: Logan Metro (2021)

The Capital League was a soccer league based in Brisbane, Queensland which was founded in 2013 and ran as the third, fourth, fifth until 2021 when then league folded in place of the Football Queensland Premier League – Metro's fourth, fifth, and sixth divisions.

== History ==
=== Capital League 1 ===
The first edition of a second tier league in the Brisbane soccer competition to be widely reported was the newly formed Division 2 in 1921. Seven clubs contested the Division 2 championship in 1921: Blackstone Rovers, Queens Park, Kangaroo Rats, Western Suburbs, Toowong, Bulimba Rangers and Kedron United. Blackstone Rovers, an Ipswich-based club, won the Division 2 premiership after beating Queens Park 1–0 in a play-off after the clubs finished level on points at the end of the regular season.

A second division of the Brisbane soccer competition has been contested continuously since 1921 with the exception of the early 1930s when the Ipswich clubs broke away from the Brisbane competition to form their own league, and during World War 2. When the top clubs split away to form the Queensland Soccer Federation in 1962, enough clubs joined the new body to form a Division One under the new State League. The QSF absorbed the former Brisbane & Ipswich District Football Association clubs in 1964 and the top two divisions were renamed back to Division One and Two in 1965. Since the formation of the Brisbane Premier League in 1983, the Brisbane soccer competition structure has been altered several times. Second tier divisions in the Brisbane competition have been:

- Division 2 (1921 to 1961)
- QSF Division 1 (1962 to 1964)
- Division 2 (1965 to 1982)
- Division 1 (1983)
- Intermediate League (1984 to 1986)
- Division 2 (1987 to 1996)
- Semi-Pro Division (1997 to 2001) – in North and South sections from 1997 to 2000
- Division 1 (2002)
- Premier Division 1 (2003 to 2012)
- Capital League 1 (2013 to present).

=== Capital League 2 ===
Prior to World War 2, the Brisbane soccer competition irregularly operating a third division when team numbers required it. After the war, the 1947 season was the first to require three divisions. Six teams participated in the 1947 Division 3 competition: Kookaburra (the eventual champions), YMCA reserves, Junction Rangers, Judeans, Caledonians and Merton Rovers reserves.

The third tier of Brisbane soccer continued to be known as Division 3 from 1947 to 1982, with reserve teams from the two top divisions continuing to participate alongside first grade teams of other clubs until the early 1970s. When the Brisbane Premier League was formed in 1983, the Tier 3 league became Division 2. An intermediate league existed at Tier 2 between 1984 and 1986 and the third tier became Amateur Division 1. From 1987 to 1996, Tier 3 was again known as Division 3 before reverting to Amateur Division 1 again between 1997 and 2001, then Division 2 for the 2002 season. Despite all these changes in divisional name, the division's format remained consistently a 12 team competition from 1977 to 2001.

=== Capital League 3 ===
The 1949 Brisbane soccer season was the first in which the number of entries required the formation of a fourth division. The seven teams competing in 1949 Division 4 were Shafston Rovers (undefeated Div 4 champions), Redbank, Wilston (all first grade teams), and reserves teams of Merton Rovers, Corinthians, Latrobe and Wynnum.

The fourth tier of Brisbane soccer continued to be known as Division 4 from 1949 to 1982, with reserve teams from higher division teams continuing to participate alongside first grade teams of other clubs until 1977. When the Brisbane Premier League was formed in 1983, the Tier 4 league became Division 3. An intermediate league existed at Tier 2 between 1984 and 1986 and the fourth tier became Amateur Division 2. From 1987 to 1996, Tier 4 was again known as Division 4 before reverting to Amateur Division 2 again between 1997 and 2001, then Division 3 for the 2002 season.
