= 2015 in Queensland soccer =

Football Queensland
- Season: 2015

The 2015 Football Queensland season was the third season since NPL Queensland commenced as the top tier of Queensland men’s football. Below NPL Queensland is a regional structure of ten zones with their own leagues. The strongest of the zones is Football Brisbane with its senior men’s competition consisting of five divisions.

The NPL Queensland premiers qualified for the National Premier Leagues finals series, competing with the other state federation champions in a final knockout tournament to decide the National Premier Leagues Champion for 2015.

== Men's League Tables ==
=== 2015 National Premier League Queensland ===
NPL Queensland
- Season: 2015
- Champions: Moreton Bay United
- Premiers: Moreton Bay United
- Matches: 132
- Goals: 514 (3.89 per match)
- Top goalscorer: Graham Fyfe (18 goals)
- Biggest home win: Brisbane Roar Youth 12–0 Western Pride (28 March 2015)
- Biggest away win: South West Qld 0–7 Western Pride (31 May 2015)
- Highest scoring: Brisbane Roar Youth 12–0 Western Pride (28 March 2015)

The National Premier League Queensland 2015 season was contested by 12 teams, all playing each other twice for a total of 22 matches.

Pos	Team	Pld	W	D	L	GF	GA	GD	Pts	Qualification or relegation
1	Moreton Bay United (C)	22	14	5	3	54	25	+29	47	2015 National Premier Leagues Finals
2	Brisbane Strikers	22	14	5	3	49	22	+27	47	2015 Queensland Finals
3	Redlands United	22	12	3	7	50	28	+22	39	2015 Queensland Finals
4	Olympic FC	22	12	3	7	55	36	+19	39	2015 Queensland Finals
5	Palm Beach	22	10	5	7	36	26	+10	35	
6	Brisbane Roar Youth	22	9	5	8	50	34	+16	32	
7	Far North Queensland	22	9	4	9	49	39	+10	31	
8	Northern Fury	22	10	1	11	42	44	−2	31	
9	Brisbane City	22	8	2	12	41	52	−11	26	
10	Sunshine Coast	22	7	3	12	33	48	−15	24	
11	Western Pride	22	7	2	13	39	57	−18	23	
12	South West Queensland Thunder	22	0	2	20	16	97	−81	2	

Source: foxsportspulse.com
Rules for classification: 1) points; 2) goal difference; 3) number of goals scored.
(C) Champions

==== Finals ====
Semi-finals
1	Moreton Bay United	3
4	Olympic	1
2	Brisbane Strikers	2
3	Redlands United	1

Grand Final
1	Moreton Bay United	2
2	Brisbane Strikers	1

==== Top Scorers ====
Rank	Player	Club	Goals
1	(Scotland) Graham Fyfe	Redlands United	18
2	(England) Antonio Murray	Brisbane City	16
2	(Australia) Tim Smits	Olympic FC	16
4	(Colombia) Jheison Macuace	Brisbane Strikers	14
4	(Australia) Royce Brownlie	Moreton Bay United	14
6	(United States) Alexander Smith	Far North Queensland	12
7	(Australia) Daniel Byrne	Olympic FC	10
7	(Australia) Jacob Fulluck	Sunshine Coast	10

=== 2015 Brisbane Premier League ===
Brisbane Premier League
- Season: 2015
- Champions: Peninsula Power
- Premiers: Lions FC
- Relegated: Wolves FC, Taringa Rovers
- Matches: 132
- Goals: 461 (3.49 per match)
- Top goalscorer: Alistair Davis (19 goals)
- Biggest home win: Capalaba 7–1 Taringa Rovers (11 April 2015)
- Biggest away win: UQ FC 1–6 Lions FC (18 July 2015)
- Highest scoring: Lions FC 7–2 UQ FC (12 April 2015)

The 2015 Brisbane Premier League was the 33rd edition of the Brisbane Premier League which has been a second level domestic association football competition in Queensland since the Queensland State League was formed in 2008. 12 teams competed, all playing each other twice for a total of 22 matches. After 22 rounds, relegation was based on the Club Championship, and included points from First Grade, Reserve Grade, U18 and U16 teams.

Pos	Team	Pld	W	D	L	GF	GA	GD	Pts	Qualification or relegation
1	Queensland Lions	22	15	5	2	53	20	+33	50	2015 Brisbane Premier League Finals
2	Eastern Suburbs	22	14	2	6	46	24	+22	44	2015 Brisbane Premier League Finals
3	Mitchelton	22	11	7	4	44	26	+18	40	2015 Brisbane Premier League Finals
4	Peninsula Power (C)	22	12	4	6	44	34	+10	40	2015 Brisbane Premier League Finals
5	Rochedale Rovers	22	10	4	8	38	31	+7	34	
6	Albany Creek	22	9	5	8	42	34	+8	32	
7	Logan Lightning	22	6	10	6	40	37	+3	28	
8	Ipswich Knights	22	8	3	11	31	46	−15	27	
9	Wolves FC (R)	22	7	4	11	37	46	−9	25	Relegated to 2016 Capital League 1 (Note: Relegation system based on Club Championship and including points from First Grade, Reserve Grade, U18 and U16 teams.)
10	Capalaba	22	6	6	10	33	37	−4	24	
11	Taringa Rovers (R)	22	2	7	13	22	56	−34	13	Relegated to 2016 Capital League 1
12	UQ FC	22	2	3	17	31	70	−39	9	

Source: foxsportspulse.com
Rules for classification: 1) points; 2) goal difference; 3) number of goals scored.
(C) Champions; (R) Relegated

==== Finals ====
Semi-finals
1	Lions FC	3
2	Eastern Suburbs	2
3	Mitchelton	1
4	Peninsula Power	2

Preliminary Final
2	Eastern Suburbs	1
4	Peninsula Power	2

Grand Final
1	Lions FC	0
4	Peninsula Power	1

=== 2015 Capital League 1 ===
Capital League 1
- Season: 2015
- Champions: Holland Park Hawks
- Premiers: Holland Park Hawks
- Promoted: North Pine
- Relegated: Annerley, Brisbane Force
- Matches: 121
- Goals: 406 (3.36 per match)
- Top goalscorer: Matthew McNab (24 goals)
- Biggest home win: Brisbane Knights 6–1 Bayside United (11 April 2015); Pine Rivers United 6–1 Brisbane Force (16 May 2015)
- Biggest away win: Brisbane Force 0–7 Holland Park Hawks (10 April 2015); Grange Thistle 0–7 North Star (4 April 2015)
- Highest scoring: Annerley 1–7 Holland Park Hawks (7 August 2015)

The 2015 Capital League 1 season was the third edition of the Capital League 1 as the third level domestic football competition in Queensland. 12 teams competed, all playing each other twice for a total of 22 matches.

Pos	Team	Pld	W	D	L	GF	GA	GD	Pts	Qualification or relegation
1	Holland Park Hawks (C, P)	21	15	4	2	69	25	+44	49	Promoted to the 2016 Brisbane Premier League
2	North Pine (P)	21	13	1	7	35	25	+10	40	Promoted to the 2016 Brisbane Premier League
3	Pine Rivers United	21	10	5	6	45	27	+18	35	2015 Capital League 1 Finals
4	North Star	21	11	2	8	39	27	+12	35	2015 Capital League 1 Finals
5	Brisbane Knights	21	10	4	7	39	35	+4	34	
6	Moggill	21	9	4	8	41	36	+5	31	
7	Mount Gravatt	21	8	5	8	32	34	−2	29	
8	Southside Eagles	21	6	7	8	27	30	−3	25	
9	Grange Thistle	21	6	4	11	26	43	−17	22	
10	Bayside United	21	5	7	9	21	38	−17	22	
11	Annerley (R)	21	4	5	12	25	46	−21	17	Relegated to 2016 Capital League 2
12	Brisbane Force (R)	11	0	0	11	7	40	−33	0 (Note: Brisbane Force withdrew after 14 matches. Their record for their first 11 matches was allowed to stand.)	Relegated to 2016 Capital League 2

(C) Champions; (P) Promoted; (R) Relegated

==== Finals ====
Semi-finals
1	Holland Park	1 (6)
2	North Pine	1 (5)
3	Pine Rivers United	0
4	North Star	2

Preliminary Final
2	North Pine	3
4	North Star	2

Grand Final
1	Holland Park	3
2	North Pine	0

=== 2015 Capital League 2 ===
Capital League 2
- Season: 2015
- Champions: Souths United
- Premiers: Souths United
- Promoted: Centenary Stormers
- Relegated: Newmarket; Westside
- Matches: 132
- Goals: 600 (4.55 per match)
- Top goalscorer: Joshua Anderson (25 goals)
- Biggest home win: Souths United 9–0 Slacks Creek (13 June 2015)
- Biggest away win: Westside 1–7 Souths United (7 August 2015)
- Highest scoring: Redcliffe PCYC 7–4 The Gap (4 July 2015)

The 2015 Capital League 2 season was the third edition of the Capital League 2 as the fourth level domestic football competition in Queensland. 12 teams competed, all playing each other twice for a total of 22 matches.

Pos	Team	Pld	W	D	L	GF	GA	GD	Pts	Qualification or relegation
1	Souths United (C, P)	22	18	1	3	95	25	+70	55	Promoted to 2016 Capital League 1
2	Centenary Stormers (P)	22	16	2	4	70	37	+33	50	Promoted to 2016 Capital League 1
3	Western Spirit	22	14	1	7	55	36	+19	43	2015 Capital League 2 Finals
4	Oxley United	22	12	2	8	62	45	+17	38	2015 Capital League 2 Finals
5	Ipswich City	22	9	2	11	40	42	−2	29	
6	Redcliffe PCYC	22	9	2	11	55	59	−4	29	
7	Park Ridge	22	9	1	12	38	45	−7	28	
8	The Gap	22	9	0	13	42	60	−18	27	
9	Pine Hills	22	8	2	12	40	59	−19	26	
10	Slacks Creek	22	8	1	13	41	64	−23	25	
11	Newmarket (R)	22	6	3	13	29	57	−28	21	Relegated to 2016 Capital League 3
12	Westside (R)	22	4	3	15	33	71	−38	15	Relegated to 2016 Capital League 3

(C) Champions; (P) Promoted; (R) Relegated

==== Finals ====
Semi-finals
1	Souths United	4
2	Centenary Stormers	0
3	Western Spirit	5
4	Oxley United	3

Preliminary Final
2	Centenary Stormers	1
3	Western Spirit	2

Grand Final
1	Souths United	3
3	Western Spirit	0

=== 2015 Capital League 3 ===
Capital League 3
- Season: 2015
- Champions: Toowong
- Premiers: Acacia Ridge
- Promoted: New Farm United
- Relegated: Kangaroo Point Rovers, Samford Rangers
- Matches: 132
- Goals: 518 (3.92 per match)
- Top goalscorer: Juan Jaimes (28 goals)
- Biggest home win: Acacia Ridge 9–0 Ridge Hills United (7 March 2015); Tarragindi Tigers 9–0 Samford Rangers (4 July 2015)
- Biggest away win: Kangaroo Point Rovers 0–7 Clairvaux (19 April 2015)
- Highest scoring: 9 goals (4 times)

The 2015 Capital League 3 season was the third edition of the Capital League 3 as the fifth level domestic football competition in Queensland. 12 teams competed, all playing each other twice for a total of 22 matches.

Pos	Team	Pld	W	D	L	GF	GA	GD	Pts	Qualification or relegation
1	Acacia Ridge (P)	22	17	2	3	77	23	+54	53	Promoted to 2016 Capital League 2
2	New Farm United (P)	22	15	3	4	51	24	+27	48	Promoted to 2016 Capital League 2
3	Toowong (C)	22	13	5	4	48	20	+28	44	2015 Capital League 3 Finals
4	Tarragindi Tigers	22	12	3	7	58	29	+29	39	2015 Capital League 3 Finals
5	Narangba United	22	10	5	7	44	46	−2	35	
6	Virginia United	22	10	3	9	46	40	+6	33	
7	Ridge Hills United	22	8	3	11	41	54	−13	27	
8	Jimboomba United	22	6	5	11	32	53	−21	23	
9	AC Carina	22	5	6	11	37	48	−11	21	
10	Clairvaux	22	5	6	11	37	51	−14	21	
11	Kangaroo Point Rovers (R)	22	5	0	17	29	64	−35	15	Relegated to 2016 Capital League 4
12	Samford Rangers (R)	22	4	3	15	18	66	−48	15	Relegated to 2016 Capital League 4

(C) Champions; (P) Promoted; (R) Relegated

==== Finals ====
Semi-finals
1	Acacia Ridge	0
2	New Farm United	3
3	Toowong	5
4	Tarragindi Tigers	1

Preliminary Final
1	Acacia Ridge	1
3	Toowong	2

Grand Final
2	New Farm United	0
3	Toowong	1

=== 2015 Capital League 4 ===
Capital League 4
- Season: 2015
- Champions: Bardon Latrobe
- Premiers: Bardon Latrobe
- Promoted: Mooroondu
- Matches: 63
- Goals: 283 (4.49 per match)
- Top goalscorer: Matthew Page (19 goals)
- Biggest home win: Brighton Bulldogs 8–1 Logan City Kings (25 July 2015)
- Biggest away win: North Brisbane 0–5 Logan City Kings (21 June 2015)
- Highest scoring: Logan City Kings 6–3 Greenbank (28 March 2015); Brighton Bulldogs 8–1 Logan City Kings (25 July 2015)

The 2015 Capital League 4 season was the third edition of the Capital League 4 as the sixth level domestic football competition in Queensland. 7 teams competed, all playing each other three times for a total of 18 matches.

Pos	Team	Pld	W	D	L	GF	GA	GD	Pts	Qualification or relegation
1	Bardon Latrobe (C, P)	18	12	2	4	51	25	+26	38	Promoted to 2016 Capital League 3
2	Mooroondu (P)	18	10	5	3	40	25	+15	35	Promoted to 2016 Capital League 3
3	North Brisbane	18	10	2	6	46	31	+15	32	2015 Capital League 4 Finals
4	Greenbank	18	7	2	9	41	53	−12	23	2015 Capital League 4 Finals
5	Brighton Bulldogs	18	7	1	10	43	42	+1	22	
6	Logan City Kings	18	6	3	9	35	54	−19	21	
7	Logan Village	18	2	3	13	27	53	−26	9	

(C) Champions; (P) Promoted

==== Finals ====
Semi-finals
1	Bardon Latrobe	1
2	Mooroondu	2
3	North Brisbane	1
4	Greenbank	4

Preliminary Final
1	Bardon Latrobe	5
4	Greenbank	2

Grand Final
1	Bardon Latrobe	2
2	Mooroondu	1

== Women's League Tables ==
=== 2015 Women's NPL Queensland ===
Women's NPL Queensland
- Season: 2015
- Champions: The Gap
- Premiers: The Gap
- Matches: 110
- Goals: 661 (6.01 per match)
- Top goalscorer: Deeanna Thompson (36 goals)
- Biggest home win: Palm Beach 18–0; Moreton Bay United (9 August 2015)
- Biggest away win: Peninsula Power 1–16 Eastern Suburbs (9 August 2015)
- Highest scoring: Palm Beach 18–0; Moreton Bay United (9 August 2015)

The 2015 Women's NPL Queensland season was the first edition of the Women's NPL Queensland as the top level domestic football of women's competition in Queensland. 11 teams competed, all playing each other twice for a total of 20 matches, with the regular season concluding on 9 August, and the finals series concluding with the Grand Final on 12 September.

Pos	Team	Pld	W	D	L	GF	GA	GD	Pts	Qualification or relegation
1	The Gap (C)	20	15	2	3	94	15	+79	47	2015 Women's NPL Qld Finals
2	Palm Beach	20	14	4	2	94	20	+74	46	2015 Women's NPL Qld Finals
3	Eastern Suburbs	20	14	4	2	88	17	+71	46	2015 Women's NPL Qld Finals
4	UQ FC	20	14	2	4	94	26	+68	44	2015 Women's NPL Qld Finals
5	Sunshine Coast	20	13	2	5	67	26	+41	41	2015 Women's NPL Qld Finals
6	Peninsula Power	20	10	0	10	67	41	+26	30	2015 Women's NPL Qld Finals
7	Olympic FC	20	9	1	10	58	28	+30	28	
8	Western Pride	20	6	1	13	42	94	−52	19	
9	South West Queensland Thunder	20	5	0	15	38	117	−79	15	
10	Souths United	20	1	0	19	10	135	−125	3	
11	Moreton Bay United (R)	20	1	0	19	9	142	−133	3	Team withdrew at end of season

Source: foxsportspulse.com
Rules for classification: 1) points; 2) goal difference; 3) number of goals scored.
(C) Champions; (R) Relegated

==== Finals ====
Elimination finals
3	Eastern Suburbs	1
6	Peninsula Power	3
4	UQ FC	1
5	Sunshine Coast	4

Semifinals
1	The Gap	2
2	Palm Beach	0
Peninsula Power	0
Sunshine Coast	1

Preliminary final
Palm Beach	3
Sunshine Coast	1

Grand final
The Gap	2
Palm Beach	1

== Cup Competitions ==
=== 2015 Canale Travel Cup ===
Brisbane-based soccer clubs competed in 2015 for the Canale Cup. Clubs entered from the Brisbane Premier League, the Capital League 1, Capital League 2 and Capital League 3.

This knockout competition was won by Queensland Lions.

The competition was also part of the FQ Cup competition, where the final of the Canale Cup served as the semi-final for the FQ Cup. The competition was also a qualifying competition for the 2015 FFA Cup. In addition to the Queensland Lions, Brisbane Strikers qualified for the final rounds, entering at the Round of 32.

=== FQ Cup ===
The competition also served as the Queensland Preliminary rounds for the 2015 FFA Cup. The four semi-finalists qualified for the final rounds of the FFA Cup; Far North Queensland FC (representing North Queensland), Palm Beach (representing South Queensland), with Brisbane Strikers and Queensland Lions representing Brisbane. The four semi-finalists, along with A-League club Brisbane Roar qualified for the final rounds, entering at the Round of 32.
