= 2013 in Queensland soccer =

Football Queensland
- Season: 2013
- Champions: Olympic FC

The 2013 Football Queensland season was the first season under a new competition format in Queensland, with NPL Queensland replacing the Queensland State League. Below NPL Queensland is a regional structure of ten zones with their own leagues. The strongest of the zones is Football Brisbane with its senior men’s competition consisting of five divisions.

The NPL Queensland premiers qualified for the National Premier Leagues finals series, competing with the other state federation champions in a final knockout tournament to decide the National Premier Leagues Champion for 2013.

== Men's League Tables ==
=== 2013 National Premier League Queensland ===
NPL Queensland
- Season: 2013
- Champions: Olympic FC
- Premiers: Olympic FC
- Matches: 132
- Goals: 612 (4.64 per match)
- Top goalscorer: Antonio Murray (27 goals)
- Biggest home win: Redlands United 11–2 Central Queensland (24 March 2013); Sunshine Coast 9–0 Central Queensland (9 June 2013)
- Biggest away win: Central Queensland 0–7 Sunshine Coast (9 March 2013); Far North Queensland 0–7 Brisbane City (23 March 2013)
- Highest scoring: Redlands United 11–2 Central Queensland (24 March 2013)

The National Premier League Queensland 2013 season was played over 22 rounds, from March to August 2013.

Pos	Team	Pld	W	D	L	GF	GA	GD	Pts	Qualification or relegation
1	Olympic FC (C)	22	18	1	3	90	39	+51	55	2013 National Premier Leagues Finals
2	Brisbane City	22	15	2	5	62	37	+25	47	2013 NPL Queensland Finals
3	Sunshine Coast	22	15	1	6	61	22	+39	46	2013 NPL Queensland Finals
4	Brisbane Strikers	22	14	0	8	63	38	+25	42	2013 NPL Queensland Finals
5	Redlands United	22	12	3	7	72	39	+33	39	
6	Moreton Bay United	22	11	3	8	39	44	−5	36	
7	Northern Fury	22	9	5	8	48	43	+5	32	
8	Western Pride	22	8	3	11	41	49	−8	27	
9	Palm Beach	22	7	1	14	41	62	−21	22	
10	Far North Queensland	22	4	4	14	30	68	−38	16	
11	Central Queensland	22	4	1	17	42	110	−68	13	
12	Queensland Academy of Sport	22	2	2	18	23	61	−38	8	Team withdrew to join NPL Queensland Youth competition

Source: sportingpulse.com
Rules for classification: 1) points; 2) goal difference; 3) number of goals scored.
(C) Champions

==== Finals ====
Semi-finals
1	Olympic FC	2
4	Brisbane Strikers	0
2	Brisbane City	2
3	Sunshine Coast	0

Grand Final
1	Olympic FC	3 (3)
2	Brisbane City	3 (0)

=== 2013 Brisbane Premier League ===
Brisbane Premier League
- Season: 2013
- Champions: Peninsula Power
- Premiers: Lions FC
- Relegated: No relegation
- Matches: 132
- Goals: 531 (4.02 per match)
- Top goalscorer: Kado Aoci (32 goals)
- Biggest home win: Wolves FC 8–0 UQ FC (5 April 2013)
- Biggest away win: Albany Creek 1–9 Wolves FC (18 May 2013)
- Highest scoring: Capalaba 3–7 Wolves FC (15 March 2013); Albany Creek 1–9 Wolves FC (18 May 2013)

The 2013 Brisbane Premier League was the 31st edition of the Brisbane Premier League which has been a second level domestic association football competition in Queensland since the Queensland State League was formed in 2008. Football Brisbane had restructured its competition from this season with the introduction of four Capital League divisions below the BPL. One consequence of the restructure was that Football Brisbane decided there would be no relegation from the BPL this season. 12 teams competed, all playing each other twice for a total of 22 rounds.

Pos	Team	Pld	W	D	L	GF	GA	GD	Pts	Qualification or relegation
1	Lions FC	22	18	2	2	68	21	+47	56	2013 Brisbane Premier League Finals
2	Wolves FC	22	16	2	4	81	26	+55	50	2013 Brisbane Premier League Finals
3	Peninsula Power (C)	22	16	1	5	63	25	+38	49	2013 Brisbane Premier League Finals
4	Rochedale Rovers	22	13	3	6	46	31	+15	42	2013 Brisbane Premier League Finals
5	Eastern Suburbs	22	13	1	8	48	28	+20	40	
6	Logan Lightning	22	10	3	9	45	42	+3	33	
7	Capalaba	22	10	2	10	46	50	−4	32	
8	Ipswich Knights	22	8	4	10	28	40	−12	28	
9	Albany Creek	22	7	0	15	32	67	−35	21	
10	Brisbane Force	22	4	1	17	31	71	−40	13	
11	North Star	22	4	1	17	24	64	−40	13	
12	UQ FC	22	3	3	16	19	66	−47	12	

(C) Champions

==== Finals ====
Semi-finals
1	Lions FC	2
4	Rochedale Rovers	1
2	Wolves FC	1
3	Peninsula Power	3

Grand Final
1	Lions FC	1
3	Peninsula Power	5

=== 2013 Capital League 1 ===
Capital League 1
- Season: 2013
- Champions: Mitchelton
- Premiers: Mitchelton
- Promoted: No promotion
- Relegated: Brisbane Knights, Western Spirit
- Matches: 132
- Goals: 558 (4.23 per match)
- Top goalscorer: David Kai (24 goals)
- Biggest home win: Pine Rivers United 11–1 Brisbane Knights (14 July 2013)
- Biggest away win: Western Spirit 0–12 Mitchelton (10 August 2013)
- Highest scoring: Brisbane Knights 4–9 North Pine (24 August 2013)

The 2013 Capital League 1 season was the first edition of the Capital League 1 as the third level domestic football competition in Queensland. 12 teams competed, all playing each other twice for a total of 22 matches.

Pos	Team	Pld	W	D	L	GF	GA	GD	Pts	Qualification or relegation
1	Mitchelton (C)	22	22	0	0	89	17	+72	66	2013 Capital League 1 Finals
2	Bayside United	22	13	4	5	54	37	+17	43	2013 Capital League 1 Finals
3	Mount Gravatt	22	13	3	6	60	35	+25	42	2013 Capital League 1 Finals
4	Southside Eagles	22	11	7	4	51	23	+28	40	2013 Capital League 1 Finals
5	Moggill	22	11	5	6	54	30	+24	38	
6	Pine Rivers United	22	10	3	9	53	31	+22	33	
7	Taringa Rovers	22	9	2	11	39	43	−4	29	
8	Pine Hills	22	8	3	11	40	33	+7	27	
9	Souths United	22	7	3	12	31	32	−1	24	
10	North Pine	22	7	3	12	46	60	−14	24	
11	Brisbane Knights (R)	22	2	1	19	25	134	−109	7	Relegated to 2014 Capital League 2
12	Western Spirit (R)	22	1	2	19	16	83	−67	5	Relegated to 2014 Capital League 2

(C) Champions; (R) Relegated

==== Finals ====
Semi-finals
1	Mitchelton	3
4	Southside Eagles	2
2	Bayside United	1
3	Mount Gravatt	5

Grand Final
1	Mitchelton	3
3	Mount Gravatt	2

=== 2013 Capital League 2 ===
Capital League 2
- Season: 2013
- Champions: The Gap
- Premiers: Annerley
- Promoted: Grange Thistle
- Relegated: Narangba United
- Matches: 132
- Goals: 600 (4.55 per match)
- Top goalscorer: Niall Stockwell (28 goals)
- Biggest home win: Ipswich City 7–0 Toowoomba Raiders (31 August 2013)
- Biggest away win: Toowoomba Raiders 3–12 Samford Rangers (24 August 2013)
- Highest scoring: Toowoomba Raiders 3–12 Samford Rangers (24 August 2013)

The 2013 Capital League 2 season was the first edition of the Capital League 2 as the fourth level domestic football competition in Queensland. 12 teams competed, all playing each other twice for a total of 22 matches.

Pos	Team	Pld	W	D	L	GF	GA	GD	Pts	Qualification or relegation
1	Annerley (P)	22	18	1	3	85	17	+68	55	Promoted to 2014 Capital League 1
2	Grange Thistle (P)	22	16	2	4	69	37	+32	50	Promoted to 2014 Capital League 1
3	The Gap (C)	22	13	2	7	52	49	+3	41	2013 Capital League 2 Finals
4	Ipswich City	22	12	3	7	72	51	+21	39	2013 Capital League 2 Finals
5	Samford Rangers	22	11	5	6	59	47	+12	38	
6	Holland Park	22	10	6	6	60	37	+23	36	
7	Slacks Creek	22	11	2	9	43	38	+5	35	
8	Park Ridge	22	8	3	11	37	51	−14	27	
9	Newmarket	22	6	3	13	30	59	−29	21	
10	Toowoomba Raiders	22	4	2	16	44	93	−49	14	Team withdrew at end of season
11	Oxley United	22	4	1	17	30	55	−25	13	
12	Narangba United (R)	22	3	2	17	19	66	−47	11	Relegated to 2014 Capital League 3

(C) Champions; (P) Promoted; (R) Relegated

==== Finals ====
Semi-finals
1	Annerley	1
4	Ipswich City	2
2	Grange Thistle	0
3	The Gap	3

Grand Final
3	The Gap	4
4	Ipswich City	2

=== 2013 Capital League 3 ===
Capital League 3
- Season: 2013
- Champions: Kangaroo Point Rovers
- Premiers: Kangaroo Point Rovers
- Promoted: Redcliffe PCYC
- Relegated: Greenbank, Acacia Ridge
- Matches: 110
- Goals: 581 (5.28 per match)
- Top goalscorer: Steven Cleary (28 goals)
- Biggest home win: Toowong 17–0 Olympic B (30 August 2013)
- Biggest away win: Greenbank 0–13 AC Carina (24 May 2013)
- Highest scoring: Toowong 17–0 Olympic B (30 August 2013)

The 2013 Capital League 3 season was the first edition of the Capital League 3 as the fifth level domestic football competition in Queensland. 11 teams competed, all playing each other twice for a total of 20 matches. Acacia Ridge withdrew during the season and was relegated to the 2014 Capital League 4.

Pos	Team	Pld	W	D	L	GF	GA	GD	Pts	Qualification or relegation
1	Kangaroo Point Rovers (C, P)	20	16	1	3	92	23	+69	49	Promoted to 2014 Capital League 2
2	Redcliffe PCYC (P)	20	14	2	4	71	21	+50	44	Promoted to 2014 Capital League 2
3	Toowong	20	11	6	3	78	35	+43	39	2013 Capital League 3 Finals
4	AC Carina	20	12	2	6	70	43	+27	38	2013 Capital League 3 Finals
5	Westside	20	8	7	5	46	32	+14	31	
6	Jimboomba United	20	9	4	7	46	37	+9	31	
7	Centenary Stormers	20	7	2	11	51	61	−10	23	
8	Ridge Hills United	20	6	4	10	46	64	−18	22	
9	Virginia United	20	5	2	13	25	57	−32	17	
10	Olympic B	20	5	1	14	30	92	−62	16	Team withdrew at end of season
11	Greenbank (R)	20	1	1	18	26	116	−90	4	Relegated to 2014 Capital League 4
12	Acacia Ridge (R)	0	0	0	0	0	0	0	0	Relegated to 2014 Capital League 4

(C) Champions; (P) Promoted; (R) Relegated

==== Finals ====
Semi-finals
1	Kangaroo Point Rovers	1
4	AC Carina	0
2	Redcliffe PCYC	2 (5)
3	Toowong	2 (4)

Grand Final
1	Kangaroo Point Rovers	2
2	Redcliffe PCYC	1

=== 2013 Capital League 4 ===
Capital League 4
- Season: 2013
- Champions: Clairvaux
- Premiers: Clairvaux
- Promoted: New Farm United, Logan City, Brighton Bulldogs
- Matches: 100
- Goals: 539 (5.39 per match)
- Top goalscorer: Craig Harvey (18 goals)
- Biggest home win: Clairvaux 12–0 Springfield United (3 May 2013)
- Biggest away win: Springfield United 1–8 Brighton Bulldogs (26 May 2013)
- Highest scoring: Bethania Rams 8–5 Bardon Latrobe (3 August 2013)

The 2013 Capital League 4 season was the first edition of the Capital League 4 as the sixth level domestic football competition in Queensland. 11 teams competed, all playing each other twice for a total of 20 matches. Springfield United withdrew halfway through the season, leaving the remaining teams to play 19 matches.

Pos	Team	Pld	W	D	L	GF	GA	GD	Pts	Qualification or relegation
1	Clairvaux (C, P)	19	16	2	1	86	14	+72	50	Promoted to 2014 Capital League 3
2	New Farm United (P)	19	16	0	3	67	23	+44	48	Promoted to 2014 Capital League 3
3	Logan City (P)	19	12	1	6	60	36	+24	37	Promoted to 2014 Capital League 3
4	Bethania Rams	19	10	2	7	53	60	−7	32	2013 Capital League 4 Finals
5	Tarragindi Tigers	19	10	1	8	50	41	+9	31	
6	Brighton Bulldogs (P)	19	8	2	9	54	49	+5	26	Promoted to 2014 Capital League 3
7	Logan Village	19	6	2	11	52	56	−4	20	
8	Mooroondu	19	6	1	12	43	49	−6	19	
9	The Lakes	19	6	1	12	41	63	−22	19	
10	Bardon Latrobe	19	4	0	15	30	81	−51	12	
11	Springfield United	10	0	0	10	3	67	−64	0	Team withdrew during the season

(C) Champions; (P) Promoted

==== Finals ====
Semi-finals
1	Clairvaux	5
4	Bethania Rams	2
2	New Farm United	2
3	Logan City	0

Grand Final
1	Clairvaux	2
2	New Farm United	0

== Women's League Tables ==
=== 2013 Women's SEQ Diamond League ===
Women's SEQ Diamond League
- Season: 2013
- Champions: The Gap
- Premiers: Redlands United
- Matches: 90
- Goals: 525 (5.83 per match)
- Top goalscorer: Melissa Limov (32 goals)
- Biggest home win: Redlands United 18–2 Toowoomba Raiders (11 May 2013)
- Biggest away win: Toowoomba Raiders 0–15 The Gap (23 August 2013)
- Highest scoring: Redlands United 18–2 Toowoomba Raiders (11 May 2013)

The 2013 Women's South-East Queensland Diamond League season was the top level domestic football of women's competition in Queensland. 10 teams competed and played each other twice. A finals series after the regular season decided the champion team.

Pos	Team	Pld	W	D	L	GF	GA	GD	Pts	Qualification or relegation
1	Redlands United	18	16	2	0	101	15	+86	50	2013 Women's SEQ Diamond League Finals
2	The Gap (C)	18	15	3	0	114	14	+100	48	2013 Women's SEQ Diamond League Finals
3	Eastern Suburbs	18	9	4	5	46	28	+18	31	2013 Women's SEQ Diamond League Finals
4	Palm Beach	18	9	4	5	51	34	+17	31	2013 Women's SEQ Diamond League Finals
5	Annerley	18	8	6	4	38	19	+19	30	
6	Peninsula Power	18	8	2	8	81	50	+31	26	
7	Souths United	18	6	1	11	36	78	−42	19	
8	Taringa Rovers	18	3	1	14	17	77	−60	10	
9	Ipswich Knights	18	2	3	13	17	63	−46	9	
10	Toowoomba Raiders	18	1	0	17	24	147	−123	3	

(C) Champions

Source: sportsTG

==== Finals ====
Semi-finals
1	Redlands United	2 (4)
4	Palm Beach	2 (2)
2	The Gap	4
3	Eastern Suburbs	1

Grand Final
1	Redlands United	1
2	The Gap	6
