= 2016 in Queensland soccer =

Football Queensland
- Season: 2016

The 2016 Football Queensland season was the fourth season since NPL Queensland commenced as the top tier of Queensland men’s football. Below NPL Queensland is a regional structure of ten zones with their own leagues. The strongest of the zones is Football Brisbane with its senior men’s competition consisting of five divisions.

The NPL Queensland premiers qualified for the National Premier Leagues finals series, competing with the other state federation champions in a final knockout tournament to decide the National Premier Leagues Champion for 2016.

== Men's League Tables ==
=== 2016 National Premier League Queensland ===
NPL Queensland
- Season: 2016
- Champions: Redlands United
- Premiers: Brisbane Strikers
- Matches: 132
- Goals: 469 (3.55 per match)
- Top goalscorer: Ben Litfin (19 goals)
- Biggest home win: Gold Coast City 7–1 SW Qld Thunder (16 April 2016)
- Biggest away win: Northern Fury FC 1–6 (twice) vs Olympic FC (4 June 2016), vs Brisbane Strikers (13 August 2016)
- Highest scoring: FNQ Heat 4–5 Olympic FC (28 May 2016)

The National Premier League Queensland 2016 season was played over 22 matches, with the regular season concluding on 21 August, semi-finals on 27 August, and the Grand Final on 3 September.

Pos	Team	Pld	W	D	L	GF	GA	GD	Pts	Qualification or relegation
1	Brisbane Strikers	22	14	5	3	51	19	+32	47	2016 National Premier Leagues Finals
2	Gold Coast City	22	12	7	3	58	29	+29	43	2016 Queensland Finals
3	Far North Queensland	22	13	3	6	42	27	+15	42	2016 Queensland Finals
4	Redlands United (C)	22	12	1	9	41	36	+5	37	2016 Queensland Finals
5	Brisbane City	22	9	8	5	35	28	+7	35	
6	Olympic FC	22	11	1	10	45	46	−1	34	
7	Moreton Bay United	22	7	8	7	36	32	+4	29	
8	South West Queensland Thunder	22	8	2	12	38	57	−19	26	
9	Brisbane Roar Youth	22	7	4	11	30	38	−8	25	
10	Western Pride	22	6	6	10	38	43	−5	24	
11	Sunshine Coast	22	7	3	12	32	45	−13	24	
12	Northern Fury	22	0	4	18	22	73	−51	4	

Source: foxsportspulse.com
Rules for classification: 1) points; 2) goal difference; 3) number of goals scored.
(C) Champions

==== Finals ====
Semi-finals
1	Brisbane Strikers	1 (2)
4	Redlands United	1 (4)
2	Gold Coast City	0
3	Far North Queensland	1

Grand Final
3	Far North Queensland	2
4	Redlands United	3

=== 2016 Brisbane Premier League ===
Brisbane Premier League
- Season: 2016
- Champions: Lions FC
- Premiers: Lions FC
- Relegated: UQ FC, North Pine
- Matches: 132
- Goals: 502 (3.8 per match)
- Top goalscorer: Ahamad Azzawi (22 goals)
- Biggest home win: Capalaba 8–0 North Star (22 May 2016)
- Biggest away win: North Star 0–5 Mitchelton (22 May 2016); Logan Lightning 0–5 Peninsula Power (30 July 2016); Logan Lightning 0–5 Mitchelton (20 August 2016)
- Highest scoring: Capalaba 4–6 Holland Park Hawks (11 June 2016)

The 2016 Brisbane Premier League was the 34th edition of the Brisbane Premier League which has been a second level domestic association football competition in Queensland since the Queensland State League was formed in 2008. After 22 rounds, the Promotion and Relegation system was based on the Club Championship, and included points from First Grade, Reserve Grade, U18 and U16 teams.

Pos	Team	Pld	W	D	L	GF	GA	GD	Pts	Qualification or relegation
1	Lions FC (C)	22	16	1	5	53	23	+30	49	2016 Brisbane Premier League Finals
2	Mitchelton	22	13	2	7	46	34	+12	41	2016 Brisbane Premier League Finals
3	Holland Park	22	12	3	7	51	34	+17	39	2016 Brisbane Premier League Finals
4	Peninsula Power	22	11	5	6	44	29	+15	38	2016 Brisbane Premier League Finals
5	Rochedale Rovers	22	11	3	8	42	27	+15	36	
6	Capalaba	22	10	3	9	49	42	+7	33	
7	Eastern Suburbs	22	9	5	8	43	35	+8	32	
8	Albany Creek	22	9	5	8	44	37	+7	32	
9	Logan Lightning	22	8	5	9	42	49	−7	29	
10	Ipswich Knights	22	6	3	13	38	53	−15	21	
11	UQ FC (R)	22	4	3	15	21	55	−34	15	Relegated to 2017 Capital League 1
12	North Pine (R)	22	3	2	17	29	84	−55	11	Relegated to 2017 Capital League 1

Source: sportstg.com
Rules for classification: 1) points; 2) goal difference; 3) number of goals scored.
(C) Champions; (R) Relegated

==== Finals ====
Semi-finals
1	Lions FC	3
2	Mitchelton	2
3	Holland Park Hawks	2
4	Peninsula Power	0

Preliminary Final
2	Mitchelton	3
3	Holland Park Hawks	0

Grand Final
1	Lions FC	4
2	Mitchelton	0

=== 2016 Capital League 1 ===
Capital League 1
- Season: 2016
- Champions: Souths United
- Promoted: Grange Thistle
- Relegated: Centenary Stormers, Pine Rivers United
- Matches: 132
- Goals: 510 (3.86 per match)
- Top goalscorer: Harun Omerovic (23 goals)
- Biggest home win: Souths United 12–1 Moggill (13 August 2016)
- Biggest away win: Pine Rivers United 0–11 Taringa Rovers (13 August 2016)
- Highest scoring: Souths United 12–1 Moggill (13 August 2016)

The 2016 Capital League 1 season was the fourth edition of the Capital League 1 as the third level domestic football competition in Queensland. 12 teams competed, all playing each other twice for a total of 22 matches.

Pos	Team	Pld	W	D	L	GF	GA	GD	Pts	Qualification or relegation
1	Souths United (P)	22	14	5	3	66	28	+38	47	Promoted to the 2017 Brisbane Premier League
2	Grange Thistle (C, P)	22	15	1	6	53	30	+23	46	Promoted to the 2017 Brisbane Premier League
3	North Star	22	14	3	5	48	23	+25	45	2016 Capital League 1 Finals
4	Southside Eagles	22	13	3	6	38	25	+13	42	2016 Capital League 1 Finals
5	Bayside United	22	12	0	10	44	27	+17	36	
6	Taringa Rovers	22	10	1	11	41	28	+13	31	
7	Wolves FC	22	9	1	12	41	42	−1	28	
8	Brisbane Knights	22	8	4	10	43	49	−6	28	
9	Moggill	22	8	3	11	40	63	−23	27	
10	Mount Gravatt	22	5	5	12	35	51	−16	20	
11	Centenary Stormers (R)	22	4	5	13	38	62	−24	17	Relegated to 2017 Capital League 2
12	Pine Rivers United (R)	22	4	1	17	23	82	−59	13	Relegated to 2017 Capital League 2

(C) Champions; (P) Promoted; (R) Relegated

==== Finals ====
Semi-finals
1	Souths United	0
2	Grange Thistle	2
3	North Star	0
4	Southside Eagles	1

Preliminary Final
1	Souths United	2 (3)
4	Southside Eagles	2 (5)

Grand Final
2	Grange Thistle	0 (3)
4	Southside Eagles	0 (2)

=== 2016 Capital League 2 ===
Capital League 2
- Season: 2016
- Champions: Acacia Ridge
- Premiers: The Gap
- Promoted: Acacia Ridge
- Relegated: Slacks Creek, Redcliffe PCYC
- Matches: 132
- Goals: 584 (4.42 per match)
- Top goalscorer: Juan Jaimes (33 goals); Ryuhei Nose (33 goals)
- Biggest home win: The Gap 14–0 Park Ridge (2 April 2016)
- Biggest away win: Redcliffe PCYC 1–9 Acacia Ridge (16 April 2016)
- Highest scoring: The Gap 14–0 Park Ridge (2 April 2016)

The 2016 Capital League 2 season was the fourth edition of the Capital League 2 as the fourth level domestic football competition in Queensland. 12 teams competed, all playing each other twice for a total of 22 matches.

Pos	Team	Pld	W	D	L	GF	GA	GD	Pts	Qualification or relegation
1	The Gap (P)	22	18	2	2	92	19	+73	56	Promoted to 2017 Capital League 1
2	Acacia Ridge (C, P)	22	15	3	4	69	18	+51	48	Promoted to 2017 Capital League 1
3	Annerley	22	13	4	5	53	29	+24	43	2016 Capital League 2 Finals
4	Brisbane Force	22	13	3	6	49	40	+9	42	2016 Capital League 2 Finals
5	Western Spirit	22	11	2	9	46	39	+7	35	
6	Oxley United	22	9	4	9	39	37	+2	31	
7	New Farm United	22	10	1	11	46	56	−10	31	
8	Pine Hills	22	6	4	12	40	52	−12	22	
9	Park Ridge	22	6	3	13	41	74	−33	21	
10	Ipswich City	22	6	1	15	39	73	−34	19	
11	Slacks Creek (R)	22	5	3	14	30	51	−21	18	Relegated to 2017 Capital League 3
12	Redcliffe PCYC (R)	22	4	2	16	40	96	−56	14	Relegated to 2017 Capital League 3

(C) Champions; (P) Promoted; (R) Relegated

==== Finals ====
Semi-finals
1	The Gap	0
2	Acacia Ridge	1
3	Annerley	2
4	Brisbane Force	1

Preliminary Final
1	The Gap	4
3	Annerley	1

Grand Final
1	The Gap	0
2	Acacia Ridge	1

=== 2016 Capital League 3 ===
Capital League 3
- Season: 2016
- Champions: Virginia United
- Premiers: Virginia United
- Promoted: Toowong
- Relegated: Mooroondu, Ridge Hills United
- Matches: 132
- Goals: 527 (3.99 per match)
- Top goalscorer: Michael Geddes (22 goals)
- Biggest home win: Toowong 7–0 Bardon Latrobe (23 July 2016)
- Biggest away win: Clairvaux 1–7 Virginia United (18 June 2016)
- Highest scoring: Clairvaux 3–8 Toowong (19 February 2016)

The 2016 Capital League 3 season was the fourth edition of the Capital League 3 as the fifth level domestic football competition in Queensland. 12 teams competed, all playing each other twice for a total of 22 matches.

Pos	Team	Pld	W	D	L	GF	GA	GD	Pts	Qualification or relegation
1	Virginia United (C, P)	22	17	3	2	67	23	+44	54	Promoted to 2017 Capital League 2
2	Toowong (P)	22	17	2	3	63	20	+43	53	Promoted to 2017 Capital League 2
3	Tarragindi Tigers	22	16	2	4	58	39	+19	50	2016 Capital League 3 Finals
4	Jimboomba United	22	10	4	8	45	34	+11	34	2016 Capital League 3 Finals
5	AC Carina	22	10	4	8	41	36	+5	34	
6	Newmarket	22	8	4	10	37	38	−1	28	
7	Narangba United	22	8	3	11	39	36	+3	27	
8	Westside	22	6	8	8	37	40	−3	26	
9	Clairvaux	22	8	2	12	41	60	−19	26	
10	Bardon Latrobe	22	6	1	15	38	67	−29	19	
11	Mooroondu	22	5	1	16	28	59	−31	16	Team withdrew at end of season
12	Ridge Hills United (R)	22	2	4	16	33	75	−42	10	Relegated to 2017 Capital League 4

(C) Champions; (P) Promoted; (R) Relegated

==== Finals ====
Semi-finals
1	Virginia United	3 (7)
2	Toowong	3 (8)
3	Tarragindi Tigers	4
4	Jimboomba United	0

Preliminary Final
1	Virginia United	2 (4)
3	Tarragindi Tigers	2 (3)

Grand Final
1	Virginia United	1 (3)
2	Toowong	1 (2)

=== 2016 Capital League 4 ===
Capital League 4
- Season: 2016
- Champions: Caboolture Sports
- Premiers: St. George Willawong
- Promoted: Caboolture Sports
- Matches: 156
- Goals: 883 (5.66 per match)
- Top goalscorer: Dane Forsyth (49 goals)
- Biggest home win: Samford Rangers 17–1 Greenbank (9 July 2016)
- Biggest away win: Greenbank 0–20 Caboolture (23 April 2016)
- Highest scoring: Greenbank 0–20 Caboolture (23 April 2016)

The 2016 Capital League 4 season was the fourth edition of the Capital League 4 as the sixth level domestic football competition in Queensland. 13 teams competed, all playing each other twice for a total of 24 matches.

Pos	Team	Pld	W	D	L	GF	GA	GD	Pts	Qualification or relegation
1	St. George Willawong (P)	24	22	1	1	136	19	+117	67	Promoted to 2017 Capital League 3
2	Caboolture Sports (C, P)	24	21	2	1	170	21	+149	65	Promoted to 2017 Capital League 3
3	Samford Rangers	24	18	3	3	136	33	+103	57	2016 Capital League 4 Finals
4	Bethania Rams	24	15	2	7	75	36	+39	47	2016 Capital League 4 Finals
5	Deception Bay	24	13	4	7	60	51	+9	43	Team withdrew at end of season
6	North Brisbane	24	12	3	9	51	57	−6	39	
7	Logan Metro	24	9	2	13	56	71	−15	29	
8	Kangaroo Point Rovers	24	9	2	13	43	65	−22	29	
9	Springfield United	24	7	5	12	33	70	−37	26	
10	Logan City Kings	24	4	2	18	32	96	−64	14	Team withdrew at end of season
11	Greenbank	24	3	5	16	36	134	−98	14	Team withdrew at end of season
12	Logan Village	24	2	4	18	21	105	−84	10	
13	Brighton Bulldogs	24	2	3	19	34	125	−91	9	

(C) Champions; (P) Promoted

==== Finals ====
Semi-finals
1	St. George Willawong	0
2	Caboolture Sports	3
3	Samford Rangers	3
4	Bethania Rams	1

Preliminary Final
1	St. George Willawong	1
3	Samford Rangers	3

Grand Final
2	Caboolture Sports	2
3	Samford Rangers	1

== Women's League Tables ==
=== 2016 Women's NPL Queensland ===
Women's NPL Queensland
- Season: 2016
- Champions: The Gap
- Premiers: The Gap
- Matches: 110
- Goals: 587 (5.34 per match)
- Top goalscorer: Kirsten Jamieson (61 goals)
- Biggest home win: Eastern Suburbs 13–0 (twice) vs Peninsula Power (30 May 2016) vs Redlands United (10 June 2016)
- Biggest away win: Peninsula Power 1–15 Olympic FC (23 April 2016)
- Highest scoring: Peninsula Power 1–15 Olympic FC (23 April 2016)

The 2016 Women's NPL Queensland season was the second edition of the Women's NPL Queensland as the top level domestic football of women's competition in Queensland. 11 teams competed, all playing each other twice for a total of 20 matches, with the regular season concluding on 22 August, semi-finals on 28 August, and the Grand Final on 4 September.

Pos	Team	Pld	W	D	L	GF	GA	GD	Pts	Qualification or relegation
1	The Gap (C)	20	20	0	0	95	8	+87	60	2016 Women's NPL Qld Finals
2	Souths United	20	16	1	3	99	18	+81	49	2016 Women's NPL Qld Finals
3	Olympic FC	20	15	1	4	109	19	+90	46	2016 Women's NPL Qld Finals
4	Eastern Suburbs	20	14	3	3	84	16	+68	45	2016 Women's NPL Qld Finals
5	South West Queensland Thunder	20	9	1	10	52	57	−5	28	
6	Sunshine Coast	20	9	1	10	42	57	−15	28	
7	Gold Coast City	20	6	3	11	39	61	−22	21	
8	Western Pride	20	5	2	13	18	48	−30	17	
9	UQ FC	20	5	2	13	27	63	−36	17	
10	Peninsula Power	20	2	3	15	20	128	−108	9	
11	Redlands United	20	0	1	19	2	112	−110	1	Team withdrew at end of season

Source: foxsportspulse.com
Rules for classification: 1) points; 2) goal difference; 3) number of goals scored.
(C) Champions

==== Finals ====
Semi-finals
1	The Gap	3
4	Eastern Suburbs	1
2	Souths United	0
3	Olympic FC	2

Grand Final
1	The Gap	4
3	Olympic FC	2

== Cup Competitions ==
=== 2016 Canale Travel Cup ===
Brisbane-based soccer clubs competed in 2016 for the Canale Cup. Clubs entered from the Brisbane Premier League, the Capital League 1, Capital League 2 and Capital League 3. The early rounds of the competition were also linked to the qualifying competition for the 2016 FFA Cup, where the 10 Brisbane-based winners from the Fourth round qualified to the fifth round of the Canale Cup competition.

This knockout competition was won by Mitchelton FC.

=== FFA Cup Qualifiers ===
Queensland-based soccer clubs competed in 2016 in the preliminary rounds for the 2016 FFA Cup. The four winners of Seventh Round qualified for the final rounds of the FFA Cup; Far North Queensland FC (representing North Queensland), Surfers Paradise Apollo (representing South Queensland), with Brisbane Strikers and Redlands United representing Brisbane. In addition, A-League club Brisbane Roar qualified for the final rounds, entering at the Round of 32.
