= Souths United FC =

Souths United Football Club
- Full name: Souths United Football Club
- Nickname: Souths
- Founded: 1961
- Ground: Wakerley Park
- Chairman: Tracey Confessore
- Head coach: Vedran Becirbegovic
- League: Queensland Premier League 2
- 2026: 5th of 12
- Website: http://www.southsunited.org.au/
| Home colours | Away colours |

Souths United Football Club is an Australian football (soccer) club based in Runcorn, a southern suburb of Brisbane, Queensland. The club was formed in 1962, and currently competes in the Brisbane Premier League. In May 2017, Football Queensland announced Souths United FC were among the 14 clubs accepted to form the Football Queensland Premier League for its initial season in 2018.

== History ==
The club was formed as South Coast United Soccer Club in 1962. The grounds that were to become the club's headquarters were provided by the Brisbane City Council in the early 1960s, originally consisting of an overgrown farm plot. This wasteland of jungle weeds and bulrushes was cleared by the club's founding members and became the Runcorn Reserve, later renamed Wakerley Park in the mid-1970s. The club's emerald green and white hooped colours originated in this early stage in the club's history, when Scottish champions Celtic F.C. provided Souths with 2 strips in their traditional white with emerald green hoops, which to this day, remain Souths colours.

South Coast United joined senior competition entering the third tier of Brisbane soccer in the 1964 season. The club absorbed the Triangles Soccer Club (previously known as YMCA Soccer Club) after the 1965 season contributing to a rapid expansion in its playing numbers. This increased participation led to a third-place finish in 1967, then promotion to Division 2 the following season.

The club changed its name to Souths United at the end of the 1972 season. After relegation to Division 3 in 1974, the club won its first senior grade premiership in 1975 and returned to Division 2 after a single season. With the formation of the Queensland State League in 1979, South United played two seasons in Division 1, but after relegation in last place in 1980 the club remained at the second or third tier of Brisbane soccer for the next two decades. In 1981 South United's Division 1 team finished 5th in the Brisbane First Division. One highlight from this era was winning the Division 1 South premiership in 1999, however the club was not promoted to the Brisbane Premier League.

In 2002 Souths United achieved a long sought after goal, achieving promotion to the Brisbane Premier League for the first time. The club finished second in Division 1 then won a promotion/relegation play-off 3–2 against Eastern Suburbs over two legs. Souths United remained in the BPL for ten seasons with its best results occurring between 2005 and 2008 when it just missed the finals series finishing fifth in 2005 and sixth in the following three seasons. In 2007 South United achieved its best cup run, progressing to the final of Brisbane Premier Cup which it lost 2–1 to Pine Rivers United.

Souths United fell two divisions to Capital League 2 after being relegated in 2012 and 2014, but bounced back to win successive promotions in 2015 and 2016 to return to the BPL for the 2017 season. This period included a 3–0 grand final victory over Western Spirit to win the 2015 Capital League 2 championship. Souths United bolstered its squad for the 2017 BPL campaign by signing former Socceroo Jon McKain.

In May 2017, Football Queensland announced Souths United FC were among the 14 clubs accepted to form the Football Queensland Premier League for its initial season in 2018.

In 2021, Souths United was relegated into Football Queensland Premier League 2, although disappointment from the Men's team, the National Premier League Women's team reached the quarter final in the Kappa Cup. The following seasons saw success for the Women's team, in which they achieved runners up in both 2022, and 2023 in the Kappa Cup.

In November 2023, Souths United brought in former Socceroo Jade North as club ambassador.

As of the 2024 season, the club competed in the Football Queensland Premier League 2 for men, Football Queensland Academy Leagues for junior boys and the National Premier League Women's for women and junior girls. The club also fielded male and female teams for seniors and juniors in divisional competitions along with Miniroos teams.

== Recent seasons ==
| Season | League | | | | | | | | | | | FFA Cup |
| Season | Division (tier) | Pld | W | D | L | GF | GA | GD | Pts | Position | Finals Series | FFA Cup |
|---|---|---|---|---|---|---|---|---|---|---|---|---|
| 2008 | Brisbane Premier League (3) | 22 | 9 | 4 | 9 | 38 | 32 | 6 | 31 | 6th | DNQ | Not yet founded |
| 2009 | Brisbane Premier League (3) | 24 | 9 | 3 | 12 | 34 | 47 | −13 | 30 | 8th | DNQ | Not yet founded |
| 2010 | Brisbane Premier League (3) | 26 | 8 | 3 | 15 | 42 | 51 | −9 | 27 | 9th | DNQ | Not yet founded |
| 2011 | Brisbane Premier League (3) | 26 | 8 | 2 | 16 | 40 | 66 | −26 | 26 | 12th | DNQ | Not yet founded |
| 2012 | Brisbane Premier League (3) | 26 | 1 | 1 | 24 | 23 | 119 | −96 | 4 | 14th ↓ | DNQ | Not yet founded |
| 2013 | Capital League 1 (4) | 22 | 7 | 3 | 12 | 31 | 32 | −1 | 24 | 9th | DNQ | Not yet founded |
| 2014 | Capital League 1 (4) | 22 | 3 | 4 | 15 | 16 | 49 | −33 | 13 | 12th ↓ | DNQ | Preliminary Round 1 |
| 2015 | Capital League 2 (5) | 22 | 18 | 1 | 3 | 95 | 25 | 70 | 55 | 1st ↑ | Champions | Preliminary Round 3 |
| 2016 | Capital League 1 (4) | 22 | 14 | 5 | 3 | 66 | 28 | 38 | 47 | 1st ↑ | Preliminary Final | Preliminary Round 4 |
| 2017 | Brisbane Premier League (3) | 22 | 8 | 5 | 9 | 45 | 41 | 4 | 29 | 8th | DNQ | Preliminary Round 5 |
| 2018 | Football Queensland Premier League (3) | 24 | 13 | 5 | 6 | 66 | 36 | 30 | 44 | 4th | Semi Final | Preliminary Round 5 |
| 2019 | Football Queensland Premier League (3) | 18 | 4 | 0 | 13 | 29 | 59 | -30 | 13 | 8th | DNQ | Preliminary Round 4 |
| 2020 | Football Queensland Premier League (3) | 20 | 3 | 3 | 14 | 30 | 65 | -35 | 12 | 10th | DNQ | FFA Cup Cancelled - COVID-19 |
| 2021 | Football Queensland Premier League (3) | 20 | 5 | 0 | 15 | 28 | 54 | -26 | 15 | 9th ↓ | DNQ | Preliminary Round 5 |
| 2022 | Football Queensland Premier League (4) | 22 | 9 | 3 | 10 | 44 | 52 | -8 | 30 | 6th | DNQ | |
| 2023 | Football Queensland Premier League 2 (4) | 22 | 5 | 3 | 14 | 26 | 53 | -27 | 18 | 10th | DNQ | |

| Key: | Premiers / Champions | Promoted ↑ | Relegated ↓ |

The tier is the level in the Australian soccer league system

== Honours ==
Due to frequent restructures and re-classifications of divisions in Brisbane football, the club's first team honours below are listed by tier in the Brisbane football pyramid.

Tier 2

- Brisbane Division 1 South – Premiers 1999
- Capital League 1 – Premiers 2016

Tier 3

- Brisbane Division 3 – Premiers 1975
- Capital League 2 – Premiers and Champions 2015

== Notable players ==
- Ben Griffin Former Brisbane Roar FC player
- Nathan Coe Former Inter Milan, PSV Eindhoven, F.C. Copenhagen, Melbourne Victory FC And Australia men's national soccer team Player
- Matt McKay Former Brisbane Roar FC Player
- Jonathan McKain Former Australia men's national soccer team player
