= Brisbane Phoenix FC =

- Full name: Brisbane Phoenix Football Club
- Founded: 1972
- Ground: CJ Greenfield Sports Complex
- League: Capital League 2
- 2016: 4th
Home colours

Brisbane Phoenix Football Club is a football (soccer) club located in the Australian city of Brisbane, Queensland.

== History ==
The club was formed as a junior team by a group of disgruntled Brisbane Lions members, mostly British immigrants, and was originally known as Inala City Soccer Club. They adopted the colours of Crystal Palace F.C. (maroon, sky-blue and white) and played their first year at the fields of the Darra United Soccer Club. A bond of friendship was formed between the two clubs. In 1973, Inala City was offered their own fields at Freeman Road, Richlands.

In 1979, Inala City expanded to form a senior club, absorbing some of its own juniors who had progressed. The club was placed in Brisbane's Division 3 and appears to have replaced the Inala Rangers club in this division. In their first season, the senior club was led by Matt Jackson to a grand final win and a victory in the Qantas Cup, a cup competition for clubs outside the Brisbane League's top two divisions. They continued to achieve well through the early to mid-1980s and the grounds were improved. In 1987, Prime Minister Bob Hawke opened a new clubhouse extension, which allowed the club to host many social functions.

In 1992 the club finished top of Division Two was promoted to the Brisbane Premier League for the 1993 season but struggled to compete at this level and was relegated the same year. Thereafter, it floated between Division 1 and Division 2.

As with many clubs at this time, Inala City's membership and volunteer numbers declined somewhat. The club attracted a new management and coaching team in 2003, changed its name to Brisbane Force Soccer Club and started a rebuilding program. In 2005 they merged with Darra United. Darra United had its own distinguished history, having won four league titles and three grand finals during the 30 seasons prior to the amalgamation.

Brisbane Force won three grand finals in four seasons between 2004 and 2007, including a 2–0 win against Beenleigh in the 2007 Premier Division 1 grand final.

After a reorganisation of the competition structure by Football Brisbane, Brisbane Force was elevated to the Brisbane Premier League for the 2013 season. The club managed to finish 10th out of 12 clubs in its first season, but finished in 11th place in 2014 and was relegated. After failing to complete its fixtures in the 2015 Capital League 1 season, the club dropped to Capital League 2 for 2016, but managed to finish in 4th place and qualify for the final series.

On 3 March 2017 the club president announced at the Annual General Meeting held the night before that the club's name was changed to Brisbane Phoenix Football Club.

On 7 December 2017 Brisbane Phoenix advised Football Brisbane that they will be withdrawing from all 2018 competitions, which includes both junior and senior competitions.

== Recent Seasons ==
Season	League											FFA Cup
Season	Division (tier)	Pld	W	D	L	GF	GA	GD	Pts	Position	Finals Series	FFA Cup
2004	Premier Division 2 (4)	22	14	4	4	54	18	36	46	4th	Champions	Not yet founded
2005	Premier Division 2 (4)	22	19	1	2	69	17	52	58	1st ↑	Champions	Not yet founded
2006	Premier Division 1 (3)	22	9	7	6	45	30	15	34	6th	DNQ	Not yet founded
2007	Premier Division 1 (3)	22	10	6	6	49	27	22	36	4th	Champions	Not yet founded
2008	Premier Division 1 (4)	22	7	5	10	36	39	−3	26	8th	DNQ	Not yet founded
2009	Premier Division 1 (4)	22	11	3	8	32	23	9	36	6th	DNQ	Not yet founded
2010	Premier Division 1 (4)	26	14	3	9	47	35	12	45	5th	Qualifying Final	Not yet founded
2011	Premier Division 1 (4)	26	9	4	13	42	48	−6	31	10th	DNQ	Not yet founded
2012	Premier Division 1 (4)	26	6	4	16	37	70	−33	22	12th ↑	DNQ	Not yet founded
2013	Brisbane Premier League (3)	22	4	1	17	31	71	−40	13	10th	DNQ	Not yet founded
2014	Brisbane Premier League (3)	22	4	3	15	24	54	−30	15	11th ↓	DNQ	Preliminary Round 3
2015	Capital League 1 (4)	11	0	0	11	7	40	−33	0^{1}	12th ↓	DNQ	Preliminary Round 3
2016	Capital League 2 (5)	22	13	3	6	49	40	9	42	4th	Semi-final	Preliminary Round 3

^{1} Withdrew from 2015 season after 14 matches. Results from their first 11 rounds stood, subsequent round results were annulled.

Key:	Premiers / Champions	Promoted ↑	Relegated ↓

The tier is the level in the Australian soccer league system. Tiers were adjusted when the Qld State League commenced in 2008.

== Honours ==
Due to frequent restructures and re-classifications of divisions in Brisbane football, the honours below list the tier in the Brisbane football pyramid.

=== Brisbane Phoenix/Brisbane Force ===
- Premier Division 2 (Tier 3) – Grand Final winner 2004
- Premier Division 2 (Tier 3) – Premiers and Grand Final winner 2005
- Premier Division 1 (Tier 2) – Grand Final winner 2007

=== Inala City ===
- Brisbane Division 3 (Tier 3) – Grand Final winner 1979
- Qantas Cup (Tier 3 and below) – Cup Final winner 1979
- Brisbane Division 2 (Tier 4) – Premiers 1985
- Brisbane Division 2 (Tier 2) – Premiers 1992
- Brisbane Division 1 (Tier 3) – Premiers 2001

=== Darra United ===
- Brisbane Division 3 (Tier 3) – Premiers and Grand Final winner 1977
- Brisbane Division 4 (Tier 4) – Premiers and Grand Final winner 1988
- Brisbane Division 1 (Tier 3) – Premiers and Champions 2000
- Metro League Division 1 (Tier 4) – Premiers and Grand Final winner 2004

== Club captains ==
- 2016–2017: Christopher Parsons
- 2011–2015: Daniel Connor
- 2010: Dave Maclot
- 2006–2009: Roger Hunter
- 2004–2006: Andrej Gaseca

== Current squad ==
1. Brody Sams
2. Zac Foy
3. Ben Taylor
4. James Bell
5. Roger Hunter
6. Takumi Imamura
7. Jeye Comerford
8. Dave Maclot
9. Pat McCarthy
10. Daniel Connor
11. Ben Clarke
12. Adam Whitby
13. Jesse Devereaux
14. Radha Amaro
15. Dylan Sinclair
16. Mario Perkic
17. Brent Woodley
18. Matt Spall
19. Trent Freeman
20. Kenan Koldzo
21. Dominic Robert
