= National Premier Leagues Queensland Men's =

National Premier Leagues Queensland
- Organising body: Football Queensland
- Founded: 2012; 14 years ago
- Country: Australia
- State: Queensland
- Confederation: AFC (Asia)
- Number of clubs: 12
- Level on pyramid: 2
- Relegation to: Football Queensland Premier League
- Domestic cup: Australia Cup
- Current champions: Lions FC (2026)
- Current premiers: Lions FC (2026)
- Most championships: Lions FC (6 titles)
- Most premierships: Lions FC (4 titles)
- Broadcaster(s): YouTube
- Website: footballqld.com.au
- Current: 2026 in Queensland soccer

The National Premier League Queensland (NPL Queensland or NPL QLD) is the top tier state-level soccer competition in the Australian state of Queensland. The conference, run by Football Queensland, is a sub division of the National Premier Leagues (NPL). The inaugural season began in March 2013 and consisted of 12 teams. Each team will be expected to field a senior team, five junior men's teams from under-12 to under-20 starting in 2013 and women's junior teams in under-13, under-15, and under-17 starting in 2014.

Each club has been granted a 5-year licence and there is no promotion or relegation from the league during this period. It was announced on 16 December 2016 that there would be promotion and relegation to the Football Queensland Premier League (FQPL) as of the 2018 season and that the league would be expanded to 14 teams. This announcement came with the addition of the Football Queensland Premier League, a new tier immediately below the National Premier League.

Peninsula Power and Eastern Suburbs were the first two teams promoted to the NPL from the FQPL for the 2019 season. No teams were relegated in 2018.

== History ==
The league directly replaced the existing Queensland State League, as part of the wider introduction of the National Premier Leagues into several states in 2013.

The league commenced with 12 teams in its inaugural 2013 season. This was increased to 14 teams in the 2014 season with the inclusion of Harimau Muda A, Southwestern Queensland and the replacement of the QAS team with the Brisbane Roar National Youth League side. However, the teams were controversially reduced to 13 mid-season, due to CQFC Energy's failure to meet licensing conditions.

== Format ==
The season consists of a regular season in which all clubs play each other twice, home and away. At the conclusion of the regular season the top of the table club progresses onto the NPL National Finals Series to play against the champions from other NPL subdivisions. Also at the conclusion of the regular season the top four clubs play a local finals series. The local finals series consists of two semi-finals and a final. In the local finals series the top of the ladder club plays the fourth place and second place plays third. The winner of these local semi finals play each other in the NPL Qld Grand Final.

== Clubs ==
The following 12 clubs competed in the 2026 NPL Queensland season.

| Team | LGA | Stadium | Founded | Joined | Head coach |
|---|---|---|---|---|---|
| Brisbane City | Brisbane | Spencer Park | 1952 | 2013 | Peter Gaffney |
| Brisbane Roar Youth | Logan | Underwood Park | 2008 | 2014 | Karl Dodd |
| Eastern Suburbs | Brisbane | Heath Park | 1922 | 2019 | Redha Alrikabi |
| Gold Coast Knights | Gold Coast | Croatian Sports Centre | 1978 | 2019 | Scott McDonald |
| Gold Coast United | Gold Coast | Coplick Sports Complex | 2017 | 2018 | Craig Midgley |
| Lions FC | Brisbane | Lions Stadium | 1957 | 2018 | Darren Sime |
| Magic United | Gold Coast | Birmingham Road Park | 2006 | 2026 | Brett Budewee |
| Moreton City Excelsior | Moreton Bay | Wolter Park | 2012 | 2013 | Cameron Millar |
| Olympic FC | Brisbane | Goodwin Park | 1967 | 2013 | Chris Grossman |
| Peninsula Power | Moreton Bay | A.J. Kelly Park | 2000 | 2019 | Aaron Philp |
| Rochedale Rovers | Logan | Underwood Park | 1973 | 2023 | |
| Wynnum Wolves | Brisbane | Carmichael Park | 1921 | 2024 | Graham Harvey |

=== Former clubs ===
| Team | City | Stadium | Founded | Joined | Departed |
|---|---|---|---|---|---|
| Brisbane Strikers | Brisbane | Perry Park | 1994 | 2013 | 2021 |
| Cairns FC (formerly Far North Qld Heat) | Cairns | Barlow Park | 2009 | 2013 | 2018 |
| Capalaba FC | Redlands | John Frederick Park | 1972 | 2020 | 2022 |
| Central Queensland Energy | Rockhampton | Rugby Park | 2012 | 2013 | 2014 |
| Harimau Muda A | Malaysia | Home of opposition team | 2014 | 2014 | 2014 |
| Logan Lightning | Logan | Cornubia Park | 2011 | 2021 | 2022 |
| Magpies Crusaders United | Mackay | Sologinkin Oval | 2017 | 2018 | 2021 |
| Northern Fury FC (Note: Northern Fury FC were formerly North Queensland Fury and North Queensland United) | Townsville | Townsville Sports Reserve / Brolga Park | 2008 | 2013 | 2018 |
| Queensland Academy of Sport | Brisbane | Meakin Park | 1991 | 2013 | 2013 |
| Redlands United | Redlands | Compass Grounds | 1918 | 2013 | 2024 |
| St George Willawong | Brisbane | St George's Park | 2010 | 2025 | 2025 |
| South West Queensland Thunder | Toowoomba | Clive Berghofer Stadium | 2012 | 2014 | 2019 |
| Sunshine Coast Fire | Sunshine Coast | Kawana Western Fields | 2007 | 2013 | 2019 |
| Sunshine Coast Wanderers | Sunshine Coast | Ballinger Park | 2017 | 2020 | 2025 |

== Honours ==
| Year | Premiers | Champions | NPL finals series representation |
|---|---|---|---|
| 2013 | Olympic FC | Olympic FC | Olympic FC – Semi Finalist |
| 2014 | Palm Beach Sharks | Palm Beach Sharks | Palm Beach Sharks – Semi Finalist |
| 2015 | Moreton Bay United | Moreton Bay United | Moreton Bay United – Semi Finalist |
| 2016 | Brisbane Strikers | Redlands United FC | Brisbane Strikers – Semi Finalist |
| 2017 | Brisbane Strikers | Western Pride | Brisbane Strikers – Runners Up |
| 2018 | Lions FC | Lions FC | Lions FC – Runners Up |
| 2019 | Lions FC | Gold Coast Knights | Lions FC – Runners Up |
| 2020 | Peninsula Power | Lions FC | Cancelled due to the COVID-19 pandemic in Australia. |
| 2021 | Peninsula Power | Lions FC | Cancelled due to the COVID-19 pandemic in Australia. |
| 2022 | Lions FC | Gold Coast Knights | Not Held |
| 2023 | Gold Coast Knights | Gold Coast Knights | Not Held |
| 2024 | Gold Coast Knights | Lions FC | Not Held |
| Year | Premiers | Champions | Australian Championship representation |
| 2025 | Moreton City Excelsior | Lions FC | Moreton City Excelsior – Quarter-finals |
| 2026 | Lions FC | Lions FC | Lions FC |

== See also ==
- National Premier Leagues
- Football Queensland Premier League
- Football Queensland Premier League – Metro
- Football Queensland Premier League – South Coast
- Brisbane Premier League (Defunct)
