= Peninsula Power FC =

Australian soccer club

Peninsula Power
- Full name: Peninsula Power Football Club
- Nickname: Power
- Founded: 2000
- Ground: A.J. Kelly Park, Redcliffe
- Chairman: Craig Feuerriegel
- Head Coach: Aaron Philp
- League: NPL Queensland
- 2025: 3rd of 12
- Website: http://www.peninsulapower.com.au/

Peninsula Power is an Australian soccer club from Redcliffe, Queensland. It was formed in 2000 following a merger of the Redcliffe City and Margate clubs. It competes in the National Premier Leagues Queensland.

== History ==
=== Redcliffe City Soccer Club ===
The Redcliffe Soccer Club initially competed in Brisbane's junior competitions, fielding a team in junior first grade in 1948. The club first competed in Brisbane senior competition in 1952, entering the league in Division 4. In its first 20 years, the club's managed just one season in Division 2 in 1962, winning just two games and being relegated.

The club changed its name to Redcliffe City after the local government area was upgraded in status from a town to a city in 1959. After a decade in the lower divisions, the club played in Division 2 from 1973 to 1978. With the formation of the Queensland State League in 1979, Redcliffe City was promoted to Division 1 but finished 11th and was relegated.

After coming third in Division 2 in 1982, Redcliffe City was promoted to Division 1 for 1983, the division below the newly formed Brisbane Premier League. The following season, the club failed to win a game and was relegated to the third tier of Brisbane soccer in which it competed from 1985 to 1992. After four season in Division 4 (Tier 4), the club returned to the third tier for its final three seasons before merging with Margate after the 1999 season.

=== Margate Soccer Club ===
Margate Soccer Club first appeared in senior soccer in the 1977 season, playing a single season in Sunshine Coast Division One. After two season in Brisbane Division 4 in 1985 and 1986, Margate returned to its focus on junior soccer. Returning to senior competition in 1994, the club won the 1997 Division 2 premiership and was promoted to the third tier. In Division 1 (Tier 3) it completed its last two seasons in the same division as Redcliffe City before the two clubs merged in early 2000 to form Peninsula Power.

=== Peninsula Power FC ===
Peninsula Power FC was formed in 2000 upon the amalgamation of the Redcliffe City and Margate soccer clubs and initially competed in Division 1, then the third tier of Brisbane soccer. It won its first honours in its first season taking out the Semi-Pro Youth competition. In the 2002 season the club finished top of Division 2 league table, winning the grand final 2–0 over Beenleigh. After grand final losses in 2004 and 2005, promotion to the Brisbane Premier League was won in 2006 with a second-place finish in Premier Division 1.

In 2007, Peninsula Power survived a close relegation battle in their first BPL season after achieving a 0–0 draw against fellow contenders Ipswich Knights on the last day of the season. In 2008 Peninsula Power finished runners-up to Rochedale Rovers in the league and runners-up in the final series after a 3–2 grand final loss to Brisbane City. The following season Peninsula Power went one better, finishing top of the Brisbane Premier League regular season for the first time in 2009. During this period the head coach was Terry Kirkham who saw the club became a mainstay of the BPL during his four season in charge.

From 2008 to 2016, Peninsula Power have qualified for the Brisbane Premier League finals series, never finishing lower than fourth place except for a sixth placing in 2010 when a Final Six finals system operated due to a 14 team league. The crowning achievement of this era was the three consecutive BPLchampionships won in 2013, 2014 and 2015. Each time the club failed to win the regular season premiership, but peaked at the right time. Their grand finals wins were:

- 2013 Won 5–1 vs Lions FC (Scorers: Power – Ally Graham 4, Joshua Ahern; Lions FC – own goal)
- 2014 Won 5–0 vs Wolves FC (Scorers: Shaun Feuerriegel 2, Taylor Hart, Greig Henslee, Richard Hurlin)
- 2015 Won 1–0 vs Lions FC (Scorer: Shaun Feuerriegel)

Peninsula Power has also won Brisbane's premier cup competition twice. Their cup final wins were:

- 2008 Won 4–2 on penalties (0–0 a.e.t.) vs Eastern Suburbs
- 2013 Won 2–0 vs Logan Lightning (Scorers: Ally Graham 2)

In 2017, Peninsula Power reached the FFA Cup proper for the first time, qualifying with a 3–0 win over Grange Thistle in the final preliminary round. In the Round of 32, Peninsula Power lost a close fought match 2–0 to A-League club Melbourne City at Dolphin Oval witnessed by 4,017 spectators, a record attendance for an FFA Cup match in Queensland.

In May 2017, Football Queensland announced Peninsula Power FC were among the 14 clubs accepted to form the Football Queensland Premier League for its initial season in 2018.

In 2018, Peninsula Power won the Football Queensland Premier League and were promoted to the Queensland National Premier League (NPL).

In 2019, Peninsula Power finished 3rd in its inaugural season in the Football Queensland National Premier League. They were eliminated in the semi-finals by Gold Coast Knights 2–1.

In 2020, a season ravaged by COVID-19 and Peninsula Power's second season in the Football Queensland National Premier League competition, they finished Premiers, winning the league by 5 points ahead of Olympic FC. They were eliminated by Lions FC in the semi-finals, 4–1

== Recent seasons ==
Season	League											FFA Cup
Season	Division (tier)	Pld	W	D	L	GF	GA	GD	Pts	Position	Finals Series	FFA Cup
2008	Brisbane Premier League (3)	22	15	3	4	60	31	29	48	2nd	Runners-up	Not yet founded
2009	Brisbane Premier League (3)	24	17	3	4	69	31	38	54	1st	Semi Final	Not yet founded
2010	Brisbane Premier League (3)	26	12	6	8	66	45	21	42	6th	Qualifying Final	Not yet founded
2011	Brisbane Premier League (3)	26	13	4	9	58	34	24	43	4th	Semi Final	Not yet founded
2012	Brisbane Premier League (3)	26	17	5	4	71	30	41	56	3rd	Semi Final	Not yet founded
2013	Brisbane Premier League (3)	22	16	1	5	63	25	38	49	3rd	Champions	Not yet founded
2014	Brisbane Premier League (3)	22	16	3	3	49	20	29	51	2nd	Champions	Preliminary Round QFs
2015	Brisbane Premier League (3)	22	12	4	6	44	34	10	40	4th	Champions	Preliminary Round 6
2016	Brisbane Premier League (3)	22	11	5	6	44	29	15	38	4th	Semi Final	Preliminary Round 4
2017	Brisbane Premier League (3)	22	13	4	5	47	31	16	43	2nd	Runners-up	Round of 32
2018	Queensland Premier League (3)	24	23	1	0	108	17	91	70	1st	Champions	Preliminary Round 7
2019	National Premier League	28	23	0	5	84	36	48	69	3rd	Semi-Final	Preliminary Round 6
2020	National Premier League	24	19	1	4	54	25	29	58	1st	Semi-Final	Not Held
2021	National Premier League	26	19	3	4	72	25	47	60	1st	Semi-Final	Round of 32
2022	National Premier League	22	12	3	7	50	35	15	39	3rd	Semi-Final	Quarter-Final
2023	National Premier League	22	9	7	6	34	30	4	34	3rd	Semi-Final	Round of 32
2024	National Premier League	22	15	2	5	50	25	25	47	3rd	Semi-Final	Preliminary Round 5

Key:	Premiers / Champions	Promoted ↑	Relegated ↓

The tier in the above table is the level in the Australian soccer league system

== Honours ==
Peninsula Power

- Tier 1 of Queensland competition
  - Football Queensland National Premier League – Premiers 2020
  - Football Queensland Premier League – Premiers 2018; Champions 2018
  - Brisbane Premier League – Premiers 2009; Champions 2013, 2014, 2015
  - Brisbane Premier Cup – Winner 2008
  - Canale Cup – Winner 2013
- Tier 3 of Brisbane competition
  - Premier Division 2 – Premiers and Champions 2002

Redcliffe City

- Tier 5 of Brisbane competition
  - Brisbane Division 5B – Premiers 1967

Margate

- Tier 4 of Brisbane competition
  - Brisbane Division 2 – Premiers 1997
- Tier 6 of Brisbane competition
  - Brisbane Division 6 – Premiers and Champions 1996
- Tier 9 of Brisbane competition
  - Brisbane Division 9B – Champions 1994
