= Moreton City Excelsior FC =

Coordinates: 27.3445°S 152.9797°E

Moreton City Excelsior
- Full name: Moreton City Excelsior Football Club
- Nicknames: Excelsior; Jets
- Founded: 1963; 63 years ago as Albany Creek Excelsior FC; 2012; 14 years ago as Moreton Bay United FC; 2023; 3 years ago as Moreton City Excelsior FC
- Ground: Wolter Park, Albany Creek; Perry Park (Championship)
- Capacity: 2,000; 5,000 (Championship)
- Manager: Cameron Millar
- League: NPL Queensland
- 2026: 3rd of 12
- Website: https://www.moretoncityexcelsiorfc.com/

Moreton City Excelsior FC (formerly Moreton Bay United FC) is an Australian soccer club located in the northern Brisbane suburb of Albany Creek and representing the City of Moreton Bay of Queensland.

The club resulted from a merger in 2023 between Moreton Bay United (formed in 2012) and Albany Creek Excelsior FC (formed in 1963), and currently competes in the National Premier Leagues Queensland. the former Albany Creek team is now being considered the Moreton City Excelsior 'Reserves' side, competing in the Brisbane Premier League.

== History ==
Former club crest (2012–2023)

Moreton Bay United FC was established in 2012 with the aim of joining the new National Premier Leagues Queensland. The club was among the 12 successful applicants selected to compete in the inaugural 2013 season of NPL Queensland.

The club has always been associated with the Albany Creek Excelsior club, with the two clubs share a home ground at Wolter Park, Albany Creek. In its initial season of competition, Albany Creek players supplied between 50% and 80% of the players in Moreton Bay United's junior teams.

Moreton Bay United's most successful season to date has been the 2015 season when the club narrowly finished top of the NPL Queensland ladder, winning the premiership on goal difference ahead of Brisbane Strikers in a title race that went down to the last day of the season. Moreton Bay United went on to beat Brisbane Strikers 2–1 in the grand final to become champions. The club qualified for the 2015 National Premier Leagues finals, beating Edgeworth Eagles 3–1 in the quarter-finals before losing 2–1 to eventual champions Blacktown City in the semi-finals.

In 2017, Moreton Bay United reached the Round of 32 stage of the FFA Cup for the first time after a 4–2 win over Olympic FC in the final preliminary round. The club went on to defeat Broadmeadow Magic 4–2 in extra time in the Round of 32, but were then knocked out 1–0 in extra time by Gold Coast City in the Round of 16. In the 2017 NPL Queensland season Moreton Bay United scraped into the final four on the last day of the regular season, then won their semi-final 3–1 against premiers Brisbane Strikers, but narrowly lost the grand final 2–1 to Western Pride after conceding a goal in the 90th minute.

In 2025 they will compete in the inaugural Australian Championship, after becoming Queensland Premiers in the regular season.

== Players ==
=== Current squad ===
As of 8 October 2025

Note: Flags indicate national team as defined under FIFA eligibility rules; some limited exceptions apply. Players may hold more than one non-FIFA nationality.

No.	Pos.	Nation	Player
1	GK	AUS	Nathan Foster
2	DF	AUS	James Murphy
4	DF	AUS	Jack McInally
5	DF	AUS	Dylan Meinicke
6	MF	ENG	Harry Arnison
7	FW	AUS	Damin Anderson
9	FW	AUS	Andrew Pengelly
10	FW	AUS	
11	FW	AUS	Joseph Scott
12	FW	AUS	Kent Vega
13	FW	SRB	Luka Jankovic
14	FW	AUS	

No.	Pos.	Nation	Player
15	MF	AUS	Christopher Maher
16	MF	AUS	Edward Ince
18	MF	AUS	
19	FW	AUS	D'Arcy Satharasinghe
20	DF	AUS	Jamie Waddington
21	GK	AUS	Riley Stent
22	MF	AUS	Lachlan Sayers
24	DF	AUS	
25	FW	AUS	Jackson Courtney-Perkins
28	DF	AUS	Trent Millard
30	GK	AUS	Kyan Ryder
—		AUS	Aden Gage-Raftery

== Seasons ==
Season	As Moreton Bay United FC												
Season	Division (tier) League	Pld	W	D	L	GF	GA	GD	Pts	Position	Queensland Finals	NPL Finals	FFA Cup
2013	NPL Queensland (2)	22	11	3	8	39	44	−5	36	6th	DNQ	DNQ	Not yet founded
2014	NPL Queensland (2)	24	12	4	8	78	53	25	40	5th	DNQ	DNQ	Preliminary Round 4
2015	NPL Queensland (2)	22	14	5	3	54	25	29	47	1st	Champions	Semi-final	Preliminary Round 6
2016	NPL Queensland (2)	22	11	3	8	39	44	−5	36	7th	DNQ	DNQ	Preliminary Round 6
2017	NPL Queensland (2)	22	12	5	5	49	27	22	41	4th	Runner-up	DNQ	Round of 16
2023	NPL Queensland	22	11	5	6	45	27	19	38	2nd		Runner-up	
As Moreton City Excelsior FC
2024	NPL Queensland	22	15	4	3	60	26	34	49	2nd		Runner-up	
2025	NPL Queensland	22	14	5	3	48	23	25	47	1st			
2025	Australian Championship												

Key:	Premiers / Champions	Promoted ↑	Relegated ↓

The tier is the level in the Australian soccer league system

== Honours ==
NPL Queensland

- Premiers: 2015, 2025
- Champions: 2015

== See also ==
- Moreton City Excelsior FC Reserves
