= Graham Fyfe (footballer, born 1982) =

Scottish footballer

Personal information
- Full name: Graham Fyfe
- Date of birth: 7 December 1982 (age 43)
- Place of birth: Dundee, Scotland
- Position: Attacking midfielder

Team information
- Current team: Rochedale Rovers

Youth career
- 1999–2003: Celtic

Senior career*
| Years | Team | Apps | (Gls) |
| 2003 | Raith Rovers | 29 | (10) |
| 2003–2005 | Cheltenham Town | 51 | (0) |
| 2005 | Hawke's Bay United | 68 | (34) |
| 2009–2018 | Redlands United | 211 | (118) |
| 2018-2019 | Rochedale Rovers | 18 | (12) |
| 2022 | Wynnum Wolves | 24 | (7) |
- * Club domestic league appearances and goals as of 20:58, 5 June 2023 (UTC)

Graham Fyfe (born 7 December 1982) is a Scottish professional footballer.

Fyfe started his career at Celtic, but first team places at the club were limited and he was loaned out to Raith Rovers during the 2002–03 season. After a 6-month loan spell with Raith Rovers, Fyfe signed for Cheltenham Town. He remained there until the end of the 2004–05 season.

Fyfe then moved to New Zealand. He linked up there with his former Cheltenham Town manager Bobby Gould, who was assistant to his son Jonathan Gould. Fyfe played there for 4 seasons and this is where he began his coaching career. Fyfe then moved to Australia in 2009 where he was signed by Redlands United (City Devils) in the Queensland State League.

Redlands United won the grand final in Fyfe's first year and Fyfe was awarded man of the match in that final. Redlands United then moved to the Brisbane Premier League in 2012. Redlands United won the league that season and Fyfe was named Brisbane Premier League Player of the Year and Golden Boot winner with 29 goals. Redlands United now compete in the National Premier League where Fyfe played until end of season 2018. He ended his 10-year stint as player and coach. In 2015 Fyfe was awarded the National Premier League's Most Valuable Player and Golden Boot Winner with 18 goals in 21 games. In 2019 Fyfe joined Rochedale Rovers where he played 18 league games, scoring 12 goals. He was part of the Grand Final winning team and picked up awards for Top Goal Scorer, Supporters Player of the Year, Best & Fairest and Players Player of the Year.

Fyfe is a member of the Brisbane Roar FC Youth Academy coaching staff, where he coaches the under 18 Mens NPL squad.
