= Oxley United FC =

Oxley United
- Full name: Oxley United FC
- Founded: 1913
- Ground: Dunlop Park, Corinda
- Manager: Lachlan Wright
- League: FQPL6 Metro Men's
- 2025 FQPL6 Metro Men's: 5th
- Website: http://www.oxleyutdfc.org.au/
Home colours

Oxley United is an Australian football (soccer) club based in Corinda, Brisbane, Queensland, Australia The club was established in 1913 and is the oldest extant club in continuous existence in the Brisbane region. Oxley United had its golden age in the late 1950s and early 1960s, winning the Brisbane First Division in 1958, and competing in Australia's first national cup competition, the 1962 Australia Cup. Oxley United FC currently competes in the FQPL5 Metro Men's competition.

== History ==
Oxley Football Club commenced informally in 1912, and went on to form a squad of players and enter competitive fixtures in 1913. Oxley fielded a senior team in the lower divisions of the Brisbane competition in the years immediately after the First World War, but only entered junior teams competitively during the 1920s. with regular success in the junior divisions. During this early period, Oxley FC was regularly referred to as the Oxley Ramblers and entered a senior team in the Ipswich and West Moreton League, a breakaway competition for the Ipswich clubs in 1930 and again in 1936, though was said to have been amalgamated with Redbank Seekers in April. The club then joined the Brisbane competition as Oxley United in 1937, completing two seasons in Division One and achieving fourth place in 1938.

After the Second World War, Oxley United rejoined Brisbane's senior competition and won the Second Division at their first attempt in 1946. Relegated after a season, Oxley played two further seasons in Division Two, then withdrew from senior football in 1950. Recommencing in Division Five in 1951, Oxley United achieved consecutive promotions through the divisions to reach Division One by 1954.

Oxley United FC then played in Brisbane's Division One continuously from 1954 until 1970. The club's finest season was 1958, winning the Division One championship, the Tristram Shield and the Hilton Shield. The following season, Oxley United lost the 1959 Division One title on goal average to Annerley, but won the Ampol Cup by a massive 8–3 margin in the Final over the same club.

The club qualified for the Division One final series in 1961 and 1962 but failed to make the grand final. Their third place finish in the 1962 Brisbane First Division season qualified them for the 1962 Australia Cup in which they were eliminated 5–2 in the first round by St George Budapest of Sydney.

Oxley United remained in the top flight of Brisbane football until 1973, except a single season in the second division when they won the 1971 Division Two title. For the next 20 years, the club went into a period of slow but steady decline at a senior level, falling as low as Division Six by 1996. Re-instated to Division Two in 1997, Oxley United has competed in Tier 3 or 4 of the Brisbane football structure for the past 20 seasons, and have participated in every Capital League 2 (Tier 3) season since the Football Brisbane re-structure of 2013.

== Recent Seasons ==
Season	League											FFA Cup
Season	Division (tier)	Pld	W	D	L	GF	GA	GD	Pts	Position	Finals Series	FFA Cup
2008	Metro League 1 (6)	22	10	7	5	49	46	3	37	5th	DNQ	Not yet founded
2009	Metro League 1 (6)	20	13	3	4	56	26	30	42	2nd ↑	Semi-Finalist	Not yet founded
2010	Premier Division 2 (5)	22	5	4	13	37	57	−20	19	11th	DNQ	Not yet founded
2011	Premier Division 2 (5)	26	11	6	9	52	45	7	39	6th	DNQ	Not yet founded
2012	Premier Division 2 (5)	22	12	1	9	48	31	17	37	5th	DNQ	Not yet founded
2013	Capital League 2 (5)	22	4	1	17	30	55	−25	13	11th	DNQ	Not yet founded
2014	Capital League 2 (5)	22	5	2	15	36	60	−24	17	9th	DNQ	Preliminary Round 1
2015	Capital League 2 (5)	22	12	2	8	62	45	17	38	4th	Semi-Finalist	Preliminary Round 2
2016	Capital League 2 (5)	22	9	4	9	39	37	2	31	6th	DNQ	Preliminary Round 2
2017	Capital League 2 (5)	22	6	3	13	30	52	−22	21	10th	DNQ	Preliminary Round 2
2022	FQPL5 (7)	22	9	4	9	41	45	-4	31	7th	DNQ	Unavailable

Key:	Premiers / Champions	Promoted ↑	Relegated ↓

The tier is the level in the Australian soccer league system

== Honours ==
Due to frequent restructures and re-classifications of divisions in Brisbane football, the club’s first team honours below are listed by tier in the Brisbane football pyramid.

Tier 1

- Brisbane Premiers 1929 (Oxley Ramblers)
- Brisbane Division 1 – Premiers 1958
- Tristram Shield – winner 1958
- Hilton Shield – winner 1958
- Ampol Cup – winner 1959

Tier 2

- Brisbane Division 2 – Premiers 1946, 1953
- Brisbane Division 2 – Premiers 1971

Tier 3

- Brisbane Division 3 – Premiers 1952

Tier 4

- Brisbane Division 3 – Grand Final winner 1983
- Brisbane Division 4 – Premiers 1989

Tier 5

- Brisbane Division 5 – Premiers 1951
