= Logan Lightning FC =

- Full name: Logan Lightning Football Club
- Founded: 1979
- Ground: Cornubia Park, Shailer Park
- Chairman: Fred Waters
- Head Coach: Rick Coghlan & James Coutts
- League: FQPL
- 2025: 5th of 12
- Website: http://loganlightningfc.com/

Logan Lightning FC is a semi-professional football (soccer) club based in Shailer Park, a suburb of Logan City, Queensland, Australia. The club's history commenced in 1979, the year of establishment for both the Beenleigh and Loganholme soccer clubs which merged in late 2011 to form the current club. The club currently competes in the Football Queensland Premier League 1 competition. In May 2017, Football Queensland announced Logan Lightning FC were among the 14 clubs accepted to form the Football Queensland Premier League for its initial season in 2018. In November 2020, Logan Lightning FC were crowned Champions and Grand Final winners of the Football Queensland Premier League, guaranteeing promotion for the club to play their 2021 season in the National Premier League Queensland for the first time in club history.

== History ==
=== Beenleigh FC ===
The Beenleigh Soccer Club was founded in 1979 initially as a component of the Beenleigh Police-Citizens Youth Club. In 1980 it became an autonomous body in its own rights. In 1982 the club entered the senior men's competition for the first time, finishing as Queensland Soccer Federation Division 6 champions and premiers in their first season. Beenleigh quickly progressed up the divisions, finishing 1983 Division 5 premiers, then winning the 1984 Division 3 grand final to win the championship and further promotion.

In 1986, the Beenleigh Soccer Club was incorporated. Beenleigh won promotion in second place in Division 2 (Tier 5 nationally) in 1986, but due to a renaming of the divisions by the QSF appeared in Division 3 (Tier 4) in 1987. The club finished premiers of Division 3 in 1992 and were then promoted to the Brisbane Premier League for the first time after a top two finish in 1995 Division 2.

Beenleigh remained in the Brisbane Premier League for three seasons until finishing last in 1998 and being relegated. From 1999 until amalgamation with Loganholme FC in 2011, the club mainly competed at the division below the BPL, but did reach the top division for a single season in 2010 after winning consecutive Premier Division 1 grand finals in 2008 and 2009.

The club was renamed Beenleigh FC in 2009 to conform with Football Brisbane policy.

Beenleigh FC's home ground was Chris Green Park, Beenleigh. Although Logan Lightning FC has used Cornubia Park as its home ground for BPL games since 2013, the club played its first two home games of the 2017 season at Chris Green Park.

=== Loganholme FC ===
Loganholme Soccer Club was formed in 1979, coincidentally the same year Beenleigh was formed. The club was based at Cornubia Park, the current home of Logan Lightning FC. The club mainly focussed on the development of junior players in its early years, and prior to 2008 only competed in the Brisbane Men's senior competition between 1988 and 1995 at the lower divisions.

In 2008 the club re-entered senior men's football, commencing in the Brisbane Metropolitan League Division 2. After two successive promotions the club had reached Premier Division 2. In 2011 Loganholme FC finished premiers and won promotion to Premier Division 1, and would have been in the same division as Beenleigh FC for the first time in 2012 had the clubs not merged their senior teams in late 2011 to form Logan Lightning FC.

=== Logan Lightning FC ===
In late 2011, the respective committees of Loganholme FC and Beenleigh FC agreed that the best course of action for the betterment of football in the area was for the two clubs to join forces under a united banner. This decision was instigated by the new criteria for inclusion in the post-2013 Brisbane Premier League announced by Football Brisbane, plus Loganholme's lack of space to accommodate its existing member base. A joint venture covering only senior football was put in place for 2012 season under the Logan Lightning FC banner.

Season 2012 proved to be extremely successful. While Beenleigh had a long history of competing in the BPL, XXXX League and Division 1, it was the first time Loganholme had competed in senior football at this level. Despite the challenges of integrating two squads into one, the side made it to the Premier Division 1 grand final, which it lost 3–1 to Pine Rivers United.

The success of the 2012 senior joint venture and a successful application from Logan Lightning FC to join the BPL for the 2013 season led to the Loganholme FC and Beenleigh FC formally merging in December 2013. In 2013 Logan Lightning finished mid-table in the league, and had their best cup run to date reaching the final of the Canale Cup which it lost 2–0 to Peninsula Power.

In May 2017, Football Queensland announced Logan Lightning FC were among the 14 clubs accepted to form the Football Queensland Premier League for its initial season in 2018. With the club receiving a formal offer to compete in August 2017.

Logan Lightning FC were crowned Champions and Grand Final winners of the Football Queensland Premier League in November 2020, guaranteeing promotion for the club to play their 2021 season in the National Premier League Queensland.

== Recent seasons ==
| Season | League | | | | | | | | | | | FFA Cup |
| Season | Division (tier) | Pld | W | D | L | GF | GA | GD | Pts | Position | Finals Series | FFA Cup |
|---|---|---|---|---|---|---|---|---|---|---|---|---|
| 2012 | Premier Division 1 (4) | 26 | 14 | 4 | 8 | 69 | 45 | +24 | 46 | 4th | Runners-up | — |
| 2013 | Brisbane Premier League (3) | 22 | 10 | 3 | 9 | 45 | 42 | +3 | 33 | 6th | DNQ | — |
| 2014 | Brisbane Premier League (3) | 22 | 10 | 3 | 9 | 36 | 38 | −2 | 33 | 5th | DNQ | Preliminary Round 5 |
| 2015 | Brisbane Premier League (3) | 22 | 6 | 10 | 6 | 40 | 37 | +3 | 28 | 7th | DNQ | Preliminary Round 3 |
| 2016 | Brisbane Premier League (3) | 22 | 8 | 5 | 9 | 42 | 49 | −7 | 29 | 9th | DNQ | Preliminary Round 4 |
| 2017 | Brisbane Premier League (3) | 22 | 6 | 2 | 14 | 38 | 57 | −19 | 20 | 11th | DNQ | Preliminary Round 6 |
| 2018 | Football Queensland Premier League (3) | 24 | 16 | 4 | 6 | 60 | 39 | 21 | 46 | 3rd | DNQ | Preliminary Round 6 |
| 2019 | Football Queensland Premier League (3) | 18 | 12 | 2 | 4 | 52 | 36 | 36 | 37 | 3rd | DNQ | Preliminary Round 7 |
| 2020 | Football Queensland Premier League (3) | 20 | 15 | 3 | 2 | 58 | 19 | 39 | 48 | 1st | Champions | DNA |

| Key: | Champions | Runners-up | Third place | Promoted | Relegated |

The tier is the level in the Australian soccer league system

== Honours ==
Logan Lightning

- Football Queensland Premier League - Premiers & Champions: 2020
- Premier Division 1 – Finalists: 2012
- Canale Cup – Runners-up: 2013

Beenleigh

- Brisbane Division 6 – Premiers & Champions: 1982
- Brisbane Division 5 – Premiers: 1983
- Brisbane Division 3 – Champions: 1984
- Brisbane Division 3 – Premiers: 1992
- Premier Division 1 – Champions: 2008, 2009
- Premier Division 1 – Runners-up: 2005, 2009
- Premier Division 1 – Finalists: 2007

Loganholme

- Brisbane Division 5 – Champions: 1994
- Premier Division 2 – Premiers: 2011

== Current squad ==
Note: Flags indicate national team as defined under FIFA eligibility rules; some limited exceptions apply. Players may hold more than one non-FIFA nationality.

| No. | Pos. | Nation | Player |
|---|---|---|---|
| 22 | GK | AUS | Matt Lugo |
| 2 | DF | AUS | Connor Simpson |
| 3 | DF | AUS | Eddie Bidwell |
| 4 | DF | AUS | Brandon LeMay |
| 5 | DF | AUS | Matt Green |
| 6 | MF | AUS | James Coutts |
| 7 | FW | AUS | Kyle Borg |
| 8 | MF | AUS | Conor Smith |
| 9 | FW | AUS | Adam Edgar |

| No. | Pos. | Nation | Player |
|---|---|---|---|
| 10 | MF | AUS | Max Fitzgerald |
| 13 | FW | AUS | Sean Sacco |
| 14 | FW | AUS | Jed Brown |
| 15 | FW | AUS | Feli Sherriff |
| 16 | MF | AUS | Brandon Reeves |
| 18 | DF | AUS | Liam Goulding |
| 20 | FW | AUS | Noah Atkins |
| 1 | GK | AUS | Nicholas Cowley |
