= Toowoomba Raiders FC =

Toowoomba Raiders FC Emblem

The Toowoomba Raiders Football Club is an Australian football (soccer) club from Toowoomba, Queensland. The club was formed in 1996, and currently have teams in the Brisbane Premier League Division 1 league. They finished 12th in 2010, however despite only being 1 place above the drop zone, they did have a 22-point buffer ahead of The Gap FC
