= Heath Park (Brisbane) =

Multi-sport venue in East Brisbane, Queensland

- Interactive map of Heath Park
- Location: East Brisbane, Queensland
- Coordinates: 27°28′41″S 153°3′9″E
- Owner: Queensland Government
- Capacity: 1,000
- Surface: Grass

Construction
- Renovated: 2007, 2008

Tenant
- Eastern Suburbs F.C.

Heath Park is a multi-sport venue located at East Brisbane, Queensland, Australia. It is home to Eastern Suburbs F.C.

== Development ==
In 2007, the club added 6 new dressing sheds toilets along with refurbishments to the clubhouse to update what was fast becoming worn out.

In 2008, the Queensland Government handed a $250,000 grant to the Eastern Suburbs F.C. to re-turf the playing field, due to the drought Queensland had suffered. The grant also went towards two new dressing sheds to cope with the rising number of female players at the club.

== See also ==
- Sport in Brisbane
