= Eastern Suburbs FC =

Australian soccer club

- Full name: Eastern Suburbs Football Club
- Nicknames: Easts, The Tigers
- Founded: 1922; 104 years ago
- Ground: Heath Park
- Capacity: 1,200
- Chairman: Glen Brown
- Head Coach: David Booth
- League: FQPL
- 2026: 7th of 12
- Website: https://eastsfootball.com/
Home colours	Away colours

Eastern Suburbs Football Club is an Australian professional soccer club based in East Brisbane, Queensland. The club is the most centrally located of all the semi-professional clubs in Brisbane, situated approximately 2.7 kilometres (1.7 mi) from the city centre. Easts competes in the National Premier Leagues Queensland, in both the men's and women's competitions, and play their home games at Heath Park, East Brisbane.

== History ==
=== Eastern Suburbs / Merton-Easts (1973 to present) ===
The club's published history asserts the club was formed in 1922. With the various mergers stretching back into the club's early history it is possible to support an earlier foundation date. Irrespective, the club's statement on its official website that it is 'one of the oldest and most established clubs in Queensland' holds true.

The current Eastern Suburbs FC was formed as the Merton-Easts Soccer Club at the end of the 1969 season when Easts-Aston Villa, a successful Division Two competitor consisting mainly of young players who had advanced through their junior ranks, amalgamated with Merton Rovers from Division One. It was the blend of experience and youth that ensured the newly founded Merton-East continued success.

The club assumed its current name Eastern Suburbs FC in September 1980, and the club was incorporated under this name in the same year. The name change was made to identify the club with a specific area of Brisbane, as well as to promote sponsorship and to differentiate the club for its prospective entry into the Queensland State League which it joined for the 1981 season.

Eastern Suburb has been a mainstay of the Brisbane Premier League, featuring in 27 of its 34-season from 1983 to 2016. During this period, the club's greatest success on the field occurred in 1989 when the club won the Brisbane Premier League championship from fifth place, beating Brisbane Lions 3–2 in the grand final. In their final season as Merton-Easts, the club also won the 1980 Division One championship with a 3–1 grand final win over Mitchelton.

In May 2017, Football Queensland announced Eastern Suburbs FC were among the 14 clubs accepted to form the Football Queensland Premier League for its initial season in 2018.

=== Merton Rovers (1915 to 1972) ===
The earliest reference to Merton Rovers was in 1915 when it competed as a junior club. Merton Rovers continued at a junior level, occasionally playing in Brisbane's Second Division until it won Division Two in 1934. Promoted to Division One and based at Yeronga Park, the club completed three season in Division One from 1935 to 1937.

After competition resumed following the World War II, Merton Rovers played 16 seasons in Division Two until finishing second in 1961 and winning promotion to the top tier of Brisbane soccer. Merton Rovers achieved much success over the next 11 seasons in Division One, reaching six grand finals and winning four of them:

- 1962 Won 2–0 vs Hellenic (scorers: L. Petersen pen., K. Melville)
- 1964 Won 1–0 vs Latrobe (scorer: J. Anthony)
- 1968 Won 4–2 vs Hollandia-Inala (scorers: E. Pattison 2, L. Willett, T. Catchpole) after a 1–1 draw (scorer: T. Catchpole)
- 1970 Lost 0–3 vs Azzurri
- 1971 Lost 1–2 vs Azzurri (scorer: B. Bohan)
- 1972 Won 1–0 vs Hellenic (scorer: B. Bohan)

While the club achieved grand final success, it failed to win the premiership, finishing runners-up on the final league table five times, including three time consecutively from 1970 to 1972.

Merton Rovers qualified for the Australia Cup in 1963 and 1964 but failed to get past the first round on each occasion.

Merton's Rovers achieved a 3–0 cup final victory over Hellenic to win the 1972 Qantas Cup. At the end of the 1972 season, Merton Rovers merged with Easts-Aston Villa to form Merton-Easts.

=== Eastern Suburbs / Easts United / Easts-Aston Villa (1938 to 1972) ===
The original Eastern Suburbs Soccer Club was formed in November 1938 following the amalgamation of two First Division clubs, Shafston United and Pineapple Rovers Shafston United had formed itself only months earlier in March 1938 upon the merging of the Shafston Rovers and United Rangers clubs. Eastern Suburbs took over Heath Park as their home ground from Pineapple Rovers and have played there ever since.

Eastern Suburbs won the Tristram Shield in 1945, winning the final 3–1 after two periods of extra time against the YMCA club. The club also won the Brisbane Division One Championship in 1951. Eastern Suburbs merged with Corinthians in September 1959 to form Easts United. After being relegated from Division One in 1963, Easts United struggled in Division Two for a couple of seasons, then merged with the strong local junior club Aston Villa. The club played as Easts-Aston Villa for seven seasons in Division Two from 1966 to 1972, performing strongly but not quite managing promotion to Division One. At the end of the 1972 season, Easts-Aston Villa merged with Merton Rovers to form Merton-Easts.

=== Pineapple Rovers (1912 to 1938) ===
While there had been soccer played Raymond Park, Kangaroo Point (known as the Pineapple Ground) since the game was first organised in Brisbane in the early 1880s, the first reference to Pineapple Rovers soccer club in the press was in 1912 when it competed as a junior club. In the years after World War I, Pineapple Rovers was among the most successful clubs in Brisbane, winning three premierships in 1919, 1924 and 1925. Two of these wins occurred in premiership play-off matches:

- 1919 Won 3–1 vs Merthyr Thistles (scorers: H. Acres 2, A. McMillan)
- 1925 Won 5–2 vs Thistle (scorers: G. Brown 2, C. Cattermole 2, L. Clark, ) after a 4–4 draw

After winning consecutive premierships in 1924 and 1925, Pineapple Rovers came into dispute with the Queensland Football Association in 1926 after its players refused to take the field in a Round 13 match with Thistle at the Brisbane Cricket Ground after one of their players had recently been suspended. The QFA suspended the club from the final two rounds of the 1926 season and imposed a £25 fine. With the fine remaining unpaid in March 1927, the QFA expelled Pineapple Rovers from the 1927 season and the club came close to disbanding.

Pineapple Rovers returned to Division One in 1928 but failed to reach its earlier heights and spent three seasons in Division Two after relegation in 1934. The club returned to Division One in 1938 for its final season before merging with Shafston United to form Eastern Suburbs.

=== Shafston Rovers / Shafston United (1912 to 1938) ===
The Shafston Rovers club first appears in the public record in 1912, coincidentally the same year that Pineapple Rovers appears to have emerged. The clubs also had their headquarters in common, both playing their home matches at Raymond Park. Shafston Rovers played as a junior club until it joined Brisbane's senior competition in 1924, winning the Division Three premiership at its first attempt. The club was promoted straight to Division One and competed for three seasons finishing runners-up in 1925 and 1927. The club's success on the field was not matched by its finances, and the club withdrew from Division One in 1928.

Shafston Rovers returned in 1928 to Brisbane's junior competition which they dominated, remaining unbeaten at their Raymond Park home for five years. After an unbeaten season in 1933 when Shafston Rovers won another junior premiership, the club returned to senior football.

The club finished Division One runners-up in 1934 and 1935, before merging with the United Rangers club in March 1938 to form Shafston United. Shafston United completed the 1938 season finishing in sixth place, then merged with Pineapple Rovers to form Eastern Suburbs.

==== Shafston Rovers (1945 to 1961) ====
A new Shafston Rovers club was formed in 1945 as a revival of the old club that merged with Pineapple Rangers to form Eastern Suburbs in early 1939. It played at Raymond Park and completed three seasons in Division 1 from 1945 to 1947. The club missed the 1948 season and returned to win Division 4 in 1949, Division 3 in 1950, and narrowly lost a Division 2 premiership play-off in 1951. The club remained in Division 2 until relegation in 1958, then went out of existence in the early 1960s.

=== United Rangers (1932 to 1937) ===
United Rangers entered the fixtures of the Brisbane Junior Soccer Association in 1932, and won the Third Grade junior premiership in 1933. The club decided against entering the senior ranks in 1934 After finishing runners-up to Redfern in the junior First Grade competition, United Rangers joined senior competition for the 1935 season. The club won the Division Two title in their first season then played two season in Division One (1936 and 1937) before amalgamating with their neighbours Shafston Rovers in March 1938 to form Shafston United.

== Recent seasons ==
Season	League											FFA Cup/ Australia Cup
Season	Division (tier)	Pld	W	D	L	GF	GA	GD	Pts	Position	Finals Series	FFA Cup/ Australia Cup
2008	Premier Division 1 (4)	22	15	4	3	58	25	33	49	1st ↑	Semi-final	Not yet founded
2009	Brisbane Premier League (3)	24	12	3	9	47	41	6	39	6th	DNQ	Not yet founded
2010	Brisbane Premier League (3)	26	15	4	7	49	34	15	49	4th	Qualifying Final	Not yet founded
2011	Brisbane Premier League (3)	26	12	5	9	51	38	13	41	5th	Qualifying Final	Not yet founded
2012	Brisbane Premier League (3)	26	12	6	8	50	37	13	42	6th	Qualifying Final	Not yet founded
2013	Brisbane Premier League (3)	22	13	1	8	48	28	20	40	5th	DNQ	Not yet founded
2014	Brisbane Premier League (3)	22	13	4	5	41	19	22	43	4th	Semi-final	Preliminary Round 3
2015	Brisbane Premier League (3)	22	14	2	6	46	24	22	44	2nd	Preliminary Final	Preliminary Round 5
2016	Brisbane Premier League (3)	22	9	5	8	43	35	8	32	7th	DNQ	Preliminary Round 5
2017	Brisbane Premier League (3)	22	8	7	7	41	31	10	31	6th	DNQ	Preliminary Round 3
2018	FQ Premier League (3)	26	16	2	6	95	47	48	50	2nd ↑	Grand Final	Preliminary Round 5
2019	National Premier League (2)	28	11	3	14	67	66	1	36	9th	DNQ	Preliminary Round 6

Key:	Premiers / Champions	Promoted ↑	Relegated ↓	DNQ = Did not qualify

The tier is the level in the Australian soccer league system

== Current squad ==
Note: Flags indicate national team as defined under FIFA eligibility rules; some limited exceptions apply. Players may hold more than one non-FIFA nationality.

No.	Pos.	Nation	Player
1	GK	AUS	Sam Long
2	MF	AUS	Mitchell Bird
3	DF	AUS	Lachlan Gorry
4	MF	AUS	Daniel Cunha
5	DF	AUS	Alexander Barnett
6	DF	AUS	Jeremy Saint
7	FW	AUS	Gpdfrey Debele
8	MF	KOR	Hyung-Joon Son
9	FW	AUS	Peter Klaassen
10	MF	AUS	Connor Booth

No.	Pos.	Nation	Player
11	FW	AUS	Morgan Saunders
12	MF	AUS	Jessie Toscano
13	FW	ENG	Alex Simmons
14	MF	AUS	Jamie Dimitroff
15	DF	AUS	Rafael Velardo
16	MF	AUS	Igor Sao Jose
17	DF	AUS	Laurie Cant
18	DF	AUS	Kai Fiechtner
20	GK	AUS	Brendan Nago
26	DF	AUS	Luke Okuda
27	FW	AUS	Vincent van Brunschot

== Club officials ==
=== Technical staff ===
Position	Name
Head coach	David Booth
Assistant coach	Matt Chandler
Assistant coach	Lee Walker
Manager	Tony Eldridge
Goalkeeping coach	Aurelien Berson
Fitness coach	Joel Morrison

== Honours ==
Eastern Suburbs / Merton-Easts (1973 to present)

- Tier 1 of Brisbane competition
  - Brisbane Premier League – Grand Final winner 1989
  - Brisbane Division 1 – Grand Final winner 1980
- Tier 2 of Brisbane competition
  - Premier Division 1 – Premiers 1998, 2000, 2003, 2008

Merton Rovers (1915 to 1972)

- Tier 1 of Brisbane competition
  - Brisbane Division 1 – Grand Final winner 1962, 1964, 1968, 1972
  - Qantas Cup – winner 1972
- Tier 2 of Brisbane competition
  - Brisbane Division 2 – Premiers 1934, 1940

Eastern Suburbs / Easts United / Easts-Aston Villa (1938 to 1972)

- Tier 1 of Brisbane competition
  - Brisbane Division 1 – Premiers 1951
  - Tristram Shield – winner 1945
- Tier 2 of Brisbane competition
  - Brisbane Division 2 – Premiers 1949, 1960

Pineapple Rovers (1912 to 1938)

- Tier 1 of Brisbane competition
  - Brisbane Division 1 – Premiers 1919, 1924, 1925

Shafston Rovers / Shafston United (1912 to 1938)

- Tier 3 of Brisbane competition
  - Brisbane Division 3 – Premiers 1924

United Rangers (1932 to 1937)

- Tier 2 of Brisbane competition
  - Brisbane Division 2 – Premiers 1935

== Junior Football ==
In the junior ranks East's suffered a decline in numbers during the 1980s as urban sprawl saw young families move to outlying suburbs of Brisbane in search of new houses and affordable land. However, the club has seen a strong resurgence in the number of junior registrations, particularly among the very young players. This would indicate that families are now beginning to move back into an area that has been so greatly affected by redevelopment in the last decade. The increasingly favourable demographics give the club great hopes for the future.

In 2010 Easts fielded 28 junior teams. Further growth is anticipated amongst the junior membership in coming seasons as more qualified coaches join the club and Eastern Suburbs FC solidifies its leadership role in youth development in Queensland.

As of 2013, the club participates in the Brisbane Premier League age competitions, fielding elite youth teams for boys at the U12, U13, U14, U15 and U16 age groups.

Since 2015, the main shirt sponsor of all MiniRoos teams has been BA Creative.

== Former players ==
Distinguished 'old boys' of the club include Ross Melville, current Chairman of the Brisbane Strikers and the CEO of YMCA Bill Hayden, the former Governor-General of Australia. Throughout its history Easts have produced many players who have gone on to play international football for Australia, including Eddie Riley, Eric Pattison, Steve Dolan, Leif Peterson and Steve Perry.

- (Scotland) Eric Ferguson (1992–93) 37 apps 7 goals

In 2010, first team player James Meyer signed professional forms with local A-League side Brisbane Roar.

One of the greatest A-league Goalkeepers of all time Jamie Young played some of his youth years at the club. He started playing for the men's first team at 14 years old.
