= Redlands United FC =

Redlands United Football Club
- Full name: Redlands United Football Club
- Nickname: The Red Devils
- Founded: 1918
- Ground: Cleveland Showgrounds Compass Grounds
- League: FQPL
- 2025: 6th of 12
- Website: http://www.redlandsunited.com.au/
Home colours	Away colours

Redlands United Football Club is an association football club based in Cleveland, Brisbane, Queensland. The club, formed in 1918, is one of the oldest soccer clubs in Queensland. It re-entered the top tier, Brisbane Premier League (BPL), in 2010 after merging with former Queensland State League (QSL) side Redland City Devils. In 2013 Redlands United gained a five-year licence for the new National Premier Leagues (NPL) competition which was renewed in 2018. From 2025 season, Redlands United currently competes in the Queensland Premier League.

== History ==

Redlands started the 2010 season relatively well, including a 7–0 thumping of Brisbane City at Spencer Park. However, due to a number of injuries the team struggled with consistency and found themselves in a relegation battle. The club, improved their form by end of the season and they finished well clear of danger in 8th place of the Brisbane Premier League.

Redlands were tipped by many to be one of the stronger sides in the 2011 Brisbane Premier League but once again were unable to fulfill their potential, eventually finishing in ninth place on 33 points. Although injuries played a part in their poor season, ultimately their inability to beat sides above them cost them dearly with the highlight probably being a 1–0 win away at Olympic FC.

In 2012, Redlands United finally fulfilled their potential, finishing top of the Brisbane Premier League by a point with two Wolves FC who won the competition in 2011. It was the first time the Devils had finished top of the table in a history that stretches back to 1918. Scottish midfielder Graham Fyfe scored twenty-nine goals for the season, which won him the Golden Boot award for top scorer in the league.

A frustrating first season in the National Premier Leagues Queensland in 2013 saw the Red Devils miss out on the play-offs by 3 points finishing 5th in the league. Injuries to key players saw the depth of the squad tested, with many of the younger players given the opportunity to cement their place in the team.

Redlands qualified for the 2016 FFA Cup, their first ever FFA Cup appearance, after defeating Pine Rivers United Sports Club, Brisbane City FC and Rochedale Rovers FC in the 2016 FFA Cup preliminary rounds. In their first ever FFA Cup match, Redlands stunned defending A-League champions and 2014 FFA Cup winners Adelaide United 2–1, in front of a crowd of 1,564 at Perry Park. The victory was lauded as the biggest upset in FFA Cup history. Redlands were eliminated in the FFA Cup Round of 16, following a 2–0 loss to Canberra Olympic.

Redlands are one of relatively few state league teams to eliminate an A-League team in the FFA Cup, which they did in 2016.

== Football Staff ==
Position	Name
Director of Football	Graham Harvey
Junior Football Director	Emilie Rochelet
Head coach	Griffin Mansfield (2024)
Assistant Coach	TBC
Assistant Coach	TBC
Goalkeeping Coach	TBC

== Current squad ==
Note: Flags indicate national team as defined under FIFA eligibility rules; some limited exceptions apply. Players may hold more than one non-FIFA nationality.

No.	Pos.	Nation	Player
1	GK	AUS	Joel D'Cruz
2	DF	AUS	Dylan Brent
3	DF	AUS	Luke Behan
4	DF	AUS	James Piercy
5	DF	AUS	Declan Robinson
6	MF	AUS	Sam Langley
7	FW	AUS	Guil Santana
8	MF	AUS	Gabriel Hawash
9	FW	JPN	Shuto Kuboyama
10	FW	JPN	Ryo Emoto
11	FW	AUS	Carlton Westerdale

No.	Pos.	Nation	Player
12	DF	AUS	Craig Peck
13	DF	AUS	Angus Broderick
14	MF	AUS	Jesse Gibbs
15	MF	AUS	Ryan Hughes
16	FW	AUS	Salomon Lukonga
17	DF	AUS	Connor Mather
18	MF	AUS	James Bonomi
19	MF	AUS	Jamie Dibbs
20	GK	AUS	Duncan Short
21	MF	AUS	Jackson Hall

== Honours ==
- 2016 - Queensland National Premier League Champions
- 2012 - Brisbane Premier League Champions
