= Greenbank FC =

Greenbank Football Club Inc
- Nickname(s): The Bankers; The Grasshoppers (Ceased)
- Founded: 1976
- Ground: Barry Whyte Field

Greenbank Football Club Inc is an amateur local football club located in the Logan West suburb of Greenbank, Queensland. It is affiliated with Football Brisbane, and as such competes in Football Brisbane sanctioned competitions. The home ground of the club is Barry White Field, Greenbank.

It currently has approximately 280 players ranging from juniors to seniors and are the current (2011) champions in Men's Metro Three, Metro Six and Women's Division 7 competitions.

== History ==
=== Formation ===
Formed in 1976, Greenbank Football Club is one of the older football clubs in the Logan West area. Originally named Greenbank Soccer Club, the club officially changed its name to Greenbank Football Club in 2008. For years, the team's unofficial nickname were The Grasshoppers, however, the name has not been used since.

Greenbank FC is known for its mixture of bottle green and gold colours. There have been numerous incarnations of the club logo, however, currently the logo has a black and white football centred with the writing "Greenbank" across the top and "Football Club Inc" surrounding the football.

=== 2011 season ===
The 2011 season saw what would arguably be the most successful season in Greenbank FC's history. Fielding six senior teams and more than one dozen junior teams Greenbank made history by winning three of its six senior grand finals. September 17, 2011 will go into Greenbank FC's history books as the day that the club celebrated the treble.

On September 17, 2011, Greenbank's Division 7 women's team faced Logan City Kings in their grand final at 12:30PM. In the searing heat, Greenbank FC dominated from start to finish piling on 3 goals by half time. Logan City failed to trouble Greenbank's defence and in the very few times Greenbank's goalkeeper was called upon, she denied Logan City pulling off a string of solid saves. Greenbank Div 7 eventually beat Logan City 5–0 to celebrate the team's first grand final win on the day. This was the perfect way to end a successful season that saw the team finish top and claim the Championship/Premiership double.

At 3PM, with the heat still in play, Greenbank's men's Metro Six came out to face their arch rivals Logan City Kings. Throughout the season Logan Kings and Greenbank traded places between first and second, with Greenbank eventually finishing second. Indeed, in all three games during the season Greenbank had failed to defeat Logan City. After coming through tough semi finals Greenbank and Logan City faced off. In a game that could be described as scrappy, Greenbank came out victorious via a 35th-minute goal by Shane Devlin.

At 6PM that same night at the same venue in Capalaba, the men's Metro Three came out to face Bethania Rams. Throughout the season Greebank's Mentro Three's were hailed as the team to beat, scoring 99 goals and winning 16 out of 20 games. Logan City had finished second, scoring 102 goals and winning 13 from 20 games.

It was, however, Bethania that was to be Greenbank's opponents in the final. Greenbank took a 5th-minute lead through their left winger Trevor Walsh. However, within 15 minutes Bethania restored parity. Ten minutes later Bethania shocked the large traveling Greenbank contingent as they scored a second. Greenbank was able to level, however, in the 72nd minute Bethania restored their lead. For the next ten minutes, Greenbank did everything they could to equalise. With five minutes to go, Andy McIntyre leveled the game and within two minutes, Justin lake scored the winner for Greenbank, capping off a fantastic season for the team and for the club.
