= Western Spirit FC =

Western Spirit
- Full name: Western Spirit Football Club
- Founded: 2005
- Ground: Kippen Park, Enid Street, Goodna
- League: Queensland Premier League 4 − Metro
- 2024: 11th of 12 (Relegated); FQPL 3 – Metro
- Website: https://www.spiritfc.com.au/

Western Spirit Football Club are an Australian football (soccer) club from Goodna, a suburb of Ipswich, Queensland, Australia. The club was formed in 2005 from a merger between Goodna Soccer Club and Camira Soccer Club and currently play in Brisbane Premier League Division 1. They narrowly missed out on promotion in 2015 finishing 3rd and then going on to make the Grand final, going down to Souths United 3–0.

The club draws its members mainly from the outer Brisbane suburbs Goodna, Camira, Springfield, Redbank Plains, Forest Lake, Inala and even Greenbank. Although Western Spirit is a relatively new club it is one of the largest clubs in the Ipswich area, as well as being 1 of only 3 clubs in the district to have 2 or more fields being in ownership of the club. The club offers almost every age-group and gender, membership, with members participating in an active team.

== Football Kit ==
Home kit 2023
