= Sunshine Coast FC =

Sunshine Coast
- Full name: Sunshine Coast Football Club
- Nickname: The Fire
- Founded: 2007; 19 years ago
- Ground: Peregian Beach College Sports Complex (Queensland, Australia) & Shrewsbury Sports Village (Shropshire, United Kingdom)
- Capacity: 2000
- Head Coach: Nick Farrington
- League: TJ Vickers Fiat Division 1 County League National Football Youth League - Southern Premier Future Lions Super league Midlands Junior Premier League
- 2026: TJ Vickers Fiat Division 1 - 8th out of 17 Teams
- Website: http://www.sunshinecoastfc.com.au/
Home colours	Away colours

Sunshine Coast Football Club is a semi-professional Australian soccer club based in the Sunshine Coast, Queensland. Nicknamed "The Fire", the club last competed in the Football Queensland Premier League, the third tier of Australian Football.

== Foundation and Queensland State League success (2007–2012) ==
Sunshine Coast FC was founded in 2007 by Noel Woodall to participate in the inaugural season of the Queensland State League (QSL), a competition designed to bridge the gap between the A-League and Queensland's regional and city-based football leagues.

The club, commonly known as the Sunshine Coast Fire, achieved immediate success, winning the inaugural Queensland State League Grand Final in 2008 by defeating Brisbane Strikers 1–0 through a goal scored by Bryan Gilfillan.

Following its inaugural championship, the Fire experienced a more challenging season in 2009, with injuries and difficulties obtaining permits for foreign players affecting the team's performance. The club finished third out of eleven teams, accumulating 41 points from 20 matches.

Sunshine Coast FC returned to championship-winning form in 2010, securing both the Queensland State League Premiership and Championship.

Under head coach Richard Hudson, the Fire continued to establish themselves as one of the competition's leading clubs. In 2012, Hudson guided Sunshine Coast FC to another QSL Grand Final victory, securing the final Queensland State League Championship before the introduction of the National Premier Leagues structure in 2013.

== National Premier Leagues era (2013–2019) ==
Following the establishment of the National Premier Leagues Queensland (NPL Queensland) in 2013, Sunshine Coast FC became a foundation participant in the new competition.

Kevin Aherne-Evans succeeded Richard Hudson as head coach for the 2013 and 2014 seasons before being replaced by Paul Arnison in 2015.

The club experienced a decline in competitive results from 2016, finishing eleventh that season before finishing bottom of the league in both 2017 and 2018.

Midway through the 2018 season, Sunshine Coast FC replaced head coach Ali Demircam with former championship-winning manager Richard Hudson, who returned to the club after a six-year absence.

Hudson subsequently resigned at the beginning of the 2019 season due to a personal injury. Former Caulfield City player Mitch Cattermole and Gary Newcome were appointed to coaching roles for the remainder of the season.

At the conclusion of the 2019 NPL Queensland season, Sunshine Coast FC was relegated to the Football Queensland Premier League (FQPL).

In September 2019, the club appointed Scottish-born Gareth Thomson as head coach.

== Development of the youth academy and appointment of Melvyn Wilkes (2014–2019) ==
Alongside its senior competitive programme, Sunshine Coast FC increasingly focused on youth development and the establishment of a professional academy structure.

In November 2014, the club appointed English professional football coach Melvyn Wilkes as Technical Director.

Wilkes brought experience in youth development and coach education, having previously worked with English professional football clubs including Manchester City, West Bromwich Albion and Nottingham Forest, as well as the English Football Association as a licensed coach educator.

Following his appointment, Wilkes began restructuring Sunshine Coast FC's youth development programme, introducing a football development model influenced by the academy systems operated by professional clubs in England and Europe.

His work focused on developing a structured player pathway, incorporating technical and tactical development, coaching education, physical preparation and the progression of young players towards senior football.

Wilkes subsequently became a central figure in the conception, design and implementation of the club's full-time football academy programmes, initially in Australia and later in the United Kingdom.

== Establishment of the Australian full-time football academy (2019–present) ==
In 2019, Sunshine Coast FC announced the development of a full-time football and education academy in partnership with Peregian Beach College on Queensland's Sunshine Coast.

The programme, spearheaded by Melvyn Wilkes, was designed to provide young footballers with an integrated academic and football development pathway, allowing students to combine formal education with daily football training.

The academy was announced in late 2019, with the programme scheduled to commence in July 2020.

Drawing on professional academy models used in English and European football, the full-time programme incorporated technical and tactical training, strength and conditioning, sports science, performance analysis and player welfare alongside academic education.

The initiative represented a significant development in Sunshine Coast FC's operations, extending the club's focus beyond traditional community and senior competition football into a full-time player development environment.

Under Wilkes' direction, the academy model was developed to provide a structured pathway for young footballers seeking opportunities in senior football, professional academies and international competitions.

The Australian programme subsequently became the foundation for Sunshine Coast FC's international academy expansion.

== Removal from Football Queensland competitions (2023) ==
Following the conclusion of the 2023 season, Sunshine Coast FC was de-affiliated from Football Queensland competitions following a dispute between the club and the state governing body.

The decision brought an end to the club's participation in Football Queensland-administered senior and junior competitions and affected its established competitive pathways within Queensland.

Sunshine Coast FC publicly questioned the decision and expressed concerns about its impact on young players and football development opportunities on the Sunshine Coast.

During the same period, the club withdrew its application to participate in Football Australia's proposed national second-tier competition.

Following its removal from Football Queensland competitions, Sunshine Coast FC pursued alternative opportunities for player development and competition, placing increased emphasis on its full-time academy structure and international football pathways.

The club's subsequent expansion into the United Kingdom became an important part of its strategy to provide academy players with access to competitive football outside Queensland.

== Melvyn Wilkes and the international academy strategy ==
Melvyn Wilkes played a leading role in the development of Sunshine Coast FC's full-time academy model and its subsequent expansion into international football.

Having initially joined the club as Technical Director in 2014, Wilkes became instrumental in establishing the Australian full-time football and education academy before extending the development model into the United Kingdom.

As Sporting Director and Head of Global Academies, Wilkes was involved in the planning, establishment and implementation of Sunshine Coast FC's international football development structure.

His approach centred on combining full-time football training with education and regular competitive matches, providing players with opportunities to develop within both Australian and English football environments.

The establishment of the UK academy represented an extension of the development structure originally introduced on the Sunshine Coast.

Through his involvement in both programmes, Wilkes became a central figure in the club's transition towards an international football academy model.

== Establishment of Sunshine Coast FC UK (2024–present) ==
Sunshine Coast FC expanded its operations into the United Kingdom through the establishment of a full-time football academy and competitive football programme in England.

Sunshine Coast FC UK Ltd was incorporated in England on 23 August 2024, providing a registered corporate structure for the club's UK operations.

The club established its UK academy in Bishop's Castle, Shropshire, with the programme designed to provide Australian and international footballers with opportunities to live, study, train and compete within the English football system.

The UK programme was developed under the leadership of Melvyn Wilkes, building on the full-time academy model previously established in Australia.

Sunshine Coast FC has reported that its UK football operations obtained affiliation within the English Football Association system, allowing its teams to participate in affiliated English football competitions.

The full-time academy combines technical and tactical coaching, strength and conditioning, sports science, performance analysis, education and competitive football.

Residential arrangements provide opportunities for Australian and international players to participate in the programme while continuing their academic studies.

The establishment of Sunshine Coast FC UK created an international development pathway connecting the club's Australian academy with competitive football in England.

== Participation in English football competitions ==
As part of its expansion into English football, Sunshine Coast FC UK developed competitive playing opportunities for academy players through youth and senior football competitions.

=== National Football Youth League ===
Sunshine Coast FC's UK academy programme includes participation in the National Football Youth League (NFYL), a competition involving football academies and youth development teams in England.

The club's under-23 team has appeared in official Football Association competition records, providing a competitive environment for academy players progressing towards senior football.

Participation in the National Football Youth League forms part of the club's approach to providing full-time academy players with regular competitive fixtures alongside their football development and education programmes.

=== Shropshire County Senior League ===
Sunshine Coast FC's UK competitive programme also includes involvement in the Shropshire County Senior League, providing a senior football pathway within the English football system.

The competition offers opportunities for developing players to experience adult football and the physical and tactical demands of senior competitive matches.

The combination of youth academy competition and senior football is intended to support the progression of players from full-time academy training into competitive senior football.

== International football development pathway ==
Sunshine Coast FC's football development structure now incorporates academy programmes in Australia and the United Kingdom.

The Australian programme provides full-time football development alongside formal education, while the UK academy offers an international training and competitive pathway within English football.

Melvyn Wilkes has been a key figure in developing and implementing this model across both countries, drawing upon his previous experience in English professional football and youth development.

The club's expansion into the United Kingdom represents a significant change in its operations following its removal from Football Queensland competitions in 2023, broadening its activities beyond Queensland domestic football and establishing an international academy and competitive football structure.

== Home ground ==
=== Former home ground — Kawana Western Fields ===
Prior to its expulsion from Football Queensland competitions in 2023, Sunshine Coast FC played its home matches at Kawana Western Fields on Queensland's Sunshine Coast. The club shared the ground with local league side Kawana Football Club.

=== Australian academy headquarters — Peregian Beach College ===
Sunshine Coast FC operates its full-time football academy at Peregian Beach College on Queensland's Sunshine Coast.

The facility serves as the club's Australian academy headquarters, combining football training, academic education and player development. The academy provides access to dedicated training facilities and educational resources within an integrated full-time football and education programme.

=== United Kingdom academy base — Shropshire, England ===
Sunshine Coast FC also operates an international full-time football academy in Bishop's Castle, Shropshire, England.

The UK academy provides football training facilities, residential accommodation and educational arrangements for Australian and international players.

The Shropshire base supports the club's football development programmes and participation in English football competitions, including the National Football Youth League and its reported involvement in the Shropshire County Senior League.

Together, the Australian and UK facilities support Sunshine Coast FC's international football development pathway.

== Senior Squad ==
2026 TJ Vickers Fiat Division One squad as of October 2026

Note: Flags indicate national team as defined under FIFA eligibility rules; some limited exceptions apply. Players may hold more than one non-FIFA nationality.

No.	Pos.	Nation	Player
1	GK	AUS	Gabriel Richards
2	DF	AUS	Cruz Sowden
3	DF	AUS	Bailey De Beus
4	DF	AUS	Sasha Vasin
5	DF	AUS	Peta Miloseski
6	MF	AUS	Steven Mamos
7	MF	AUS	Marcus Menara
8	MF	AUS	Mitchell Thomas

No.	Pos.	Nation	Player
10	MF	AUS	Lyle Mugabe
11	FW	AUS	Brett Davies
12	MF	AUS	Bailey Minett
13	DF	AUS	Oliver Ford
14	MF	AUS	Jayden Boztepe
15	MF	AUS	Kyle Wilkes
19	FW	AUS	Hudson Waltham
21	GK	AUS	Zavier Kooistra
—	FW	AUS	Levi Jones

== Senior coaching staff ==
Technical Director	Aaron Duce
Sporting Director	Melvyn Wilkes
Head Coach / UK Lead	Nick Farrington
Assistant Coach UK	Kyle Wilkes

== Honours ==
- Queensland State League
  - Premiership (3): 2008, 2010, 2011
  - Championship (4): 2008, 2010, 2011, 2012
