= Queensland Lions FC =

Australian association football club

Lions FC
- Full name: Lions Football Club
- Nickname: Lions
- Founded: 1957 (69 years ago) as Hollandia-Inala F.C.
- Ground: Lions Stadium
- Capacity: 5,000
- Head Coach: Darren Sime
- League: NPL Queensland
- 2026: 1st of 12 (premiers & champions)
- Website: lionsfootballclub.com.au
Home colours	Away colours

Lions FC also formerly known as Queensland Lions Football Club, is a semi professional soccer club based in Brisbane, Australia. Founded in 1957 as Hollandia Inala Soccer Club, the club currently competes in the National Premier Leagues Queensland. They also as invitee in Australian Championship after winning as premiers in 2026 NPL QLD season. The team also have men and women sides for competing in Brisbane Metro League (Division 1-5) and also Queensland Master Football where they have teams from Division 1-9.

== History ==
Chart of yearly table positions for Brisbane Lions in NSL

The club was founded in 1957 as Hollandia-Inala Soccer Club by Dutch immigrants. From the start they were based at grounds in the Brisbane suburb of Darra and then moved to Pine Road, Richlands, where they play today. In the early 1970s, all clubs were required to abandon 'ethnic' names and they then adopted the name Brisbane Lions.

In 1977 they were invited to play in the National Soccer League and played in the league as Brisbane Lions until the end of the 1988 season. Former Manchester United and Northern Ireland legend George Best made four appearances for the team during the 1983/84 season. Notable players around this time include: Bob Latchford from Everton in 1981, Col Bennett, Jim Hermiston, Ron Millman, Nigel Lowndes, Steve Jackson, Danny Wright, Steve Hogg, Alan Niven, Russell Stewart. From 1989 the Brisbane Lions played in the Brisbane Premier League. After coming to an agreement with the newly formed Brisbane Lions AFL club, they changed their name to the current Queensland Lions.

In 2004 it was announced that the Lions had won the right to compete in the newly formed A-League. Operating as Queensland Roar the club was once again represented in an Australian national league.

=== Re-formation ===
Subsequent changes to the ownership structure of the Roar allowed the Queensland Lions to re-enter the Brisbane competition in Premier Division 1 in 2008.

In 2012, Lions FC was accepted into the inaugural 2013 Brisbane Premier League, the top local competition in the Brisbane region. In 2016, the club went back-to-back claiming the premiership and Grand Final.

When the National Premier Leagues Queensland expanded in 2018, Lions FC were one of the clubs to join the competition. In its first season in the NPLQ, Lions won the league and grand final double. In 2019, the club followed it up with a back-to-back premiership, winning the league with 2 games to spare. However, in the finals series, Lions went down 2–1 to Olympic FC in the semi-final.

== Current squad ==
As of 5 August 2024

Note: Flags indicate national team as defined under FIFA eligibility rules; some limited exceptions apply. Players may hold more than one non-FIFA nationality.

No.	Pos.	Nation	Player
1	GK	AUS	Cardiff Pond
2	DF	AUS	Dom Horwood
3	DF	AUS	Jackson Hart-Phillips
5	DF	AUS	Tommy Jarrard
6	MF	NZL	Matthew Ridenton
7	FW	AUS	Alex Fiechtner
9	FW	AUS	Andy Pengelly
10	MF	AUS	Joe Duckworth
11	FW	AUS	Luke Broderick

No.	Pos.	Nation	Player
12	MF	AUS	Shaun Carlos
14	DF	AUS	Josh Brindell-South
15	MF	AUS	Fletcher McDonald
16	DF	AUS	Jake Minett
18	DF	PNG	Alwin Komolong
21	FW	AUS	Jack Skinner
23	FW	AUS	Finn Beakhearst
30	MF	AUS	James Enticknap
90	GK	AUS	Luke Borean

== Club officials ==
=== Technical staff ===
Position	Name
Head coach	(England) Dan Barber
Technical Director	(Australia) Gabriel Hawash

== Honours ==
- National Premier Leagues Queensland **Premiers 2022, 2026
- National Premier Leagues Queensland **Champions 2018, 2020, 2021, 2024, 2025, 2026
- Brisbane Premier League
  - Premiers 1968, 1973, 1974, 1975, 1987, 1990, 1991, 1996, 2002, 2003, 2004, 2013, 2015, 2016;
  - Champions 1967, 1969, 1987, 1991, 1996, 1998, 2002, 2003, 2004, 2016, 2017
- Kappa Queensland Cup – Winner 2026
- Queensland State Cup – Winner 2004
- Brisbane Premier Cup – Winner 2002, 2003
- Canale Cup – Winner 2012, 2015
