= Brisbane Premier League =

- Founded: 1983; 43 years ago
- Folded: 2021; 5 years ago
- Country: Australia
- State: Queensland
- Number of clubs: 12
- Level on pyramid: 5
- Domestic cup(s): National; Australia Cup; Regional; Canale Cup
- Website: Football Queensland Premier League - Metro

The Brisbane Premier League was the first tier of senior soccer in Brisbane, Queensland (fourth tier in Queensland and fifth overall in Australia). It was run and administered by Football Queensland Metro. The competition folded and was revamped in 2021 with Football Queensland's takeover of the league structure from Football Brisbane, where they formed the Football Queensland Premier League – Metro.

== Honours ==
Governing body	Competition and Year	Premiers
Anglo-Qld; Football Association	1884	Rangers
Anglo-Qld; Football Association	1885	St. Andrews
Anglo-Qld; Football Association	1886	St. Andrews
Anglo-Qld; Football Association	1887 Challenge Cup	St. Andrews
Anglo-Qld; Football Association	1888 Challenge Cup	Thistles
Anglo-Qld; Football Association	1889	Not known
Qld British; Football Association	1890	Not known
Qld British; Football Association	1891	Not known
Qld British; Football Association	1892 Challenge Cup	Withheld
Qld British; Football Association	1893 Challenge Cup	Rosebank
Qld British; Football Association	1894 Challenge Cup	Normans
Qld British; Football Association	1895 Challenge Cup	Dinmore Bush Rats
Qld British; Football Association	1896 Challenge Cup	Ipswich Rovers
Qld British; Football Association	1897 Challenge Cup	Rosebank
Qld British; Football Association	1898 Challenge Cup	Dinmore Bush Rats
Qld British; Football Association	1899 Challenge Cup	Dinmore Bush Rats
Qld British; Football Association	1900 Challenge Cup	Dinmore Bush Rats
Qld British; Football Association	1901 Challenge Cup	Dinmore Bush Rats
Qld British; Football Association	1902	No fixture competition ^{1, 2}
Qld British; Football Association	1903 Challenge Cup	Dinmore Bush Rats
Qld British; Football Association	1904 Challenge Cup	Blackstone Rovers B
Qld British; Football Association	1905 Challenge Cup	Wellington
Qld British; Football Association	1906 Challenge Cup	Wellington
Qld British; Football Association	1907 Challenge Cup	Dinmore Bush Rats
Qld British; Football Association	1908	Not known
Qld British; Football Association	1909 Challenge Cup	Wellington
Qld British; Football Association	1910 Challenge Cup	Dinmore Bush Rats
Qld British; Football Association	1911 Challenge Cup	Bulimba Rangers
Qld British; Football Association	1912 Challenge Cup	Blackstone Rovers
Qld British; Football Association	1913 Challenge Cup	Bulimba Rangers
Qld British; Football Association	1914 Challenge Cup	Toowong Caledonians
Qld British; Football Association	1915 Challenge Cup	Corinthians
Qld British; Football Association	1916	No competition due to World War 1
Qld British; Football Association	1917	No First Division competition due to World War 1^{3}
Qld British; Football Association	1918	No First Division competition due to World War 1^{3}
Qld British; Football Association	1919 Challenge Cup	Pineapple Rovers
Queensland; Football Association	1920 Challenge Cup	Corinthians
Queensland; Football Association	1921 Challenge Cup	Dinmore Bush Rats
Queensland; Football Association	1922 Challenge Cup	Bundamba Rangers
Queensland; Football Association	1923 Challenge Cup	Thistle
Queensland; Football Association	1924 Challenge Cup	Pineapple Rovers
Queensland; Football Association	1925 Challenge Cup	Pineapple Rovers
Queensland; Football Association	1926 Challenge Cup	Blackstone Rovers
Queensland; Football Association	1927 Challenge Cup	Bundamba Rangers
Brisbane & District; Football Association	1928 Challenge Cup	Bundamba Rangers
Brisbane & District; Football Association	1929 Challenge Cup	Latrobe
Brisbane & District; Football Association	1930 1st Division	Latrobe
Brisbane & District; Football Association	1931 1st Division	Latrobe
Brisbane & District; Football Association	1932 1st Division	Latrobe
Brisbane & District; Football Association	1933 1st Division	Latrobe
Brisbane & District; Football Association	1934 First Division	YMCA
Brisbane & District; Football Association	1935 First Division	Latrobe
Brisbane & District; Football Association	1936 First Division	YMCA
Brisbane & District; Football Association	1937 First Division	Bundamba Rangers
Brisbane & District; Football Association	1938 First Division	Bundamba Rangers
Brisbane & District; Football Association	1939 First Division	Bundamba Rangers
Queensland; Soccer Football; Association	1940 First Division	Corinthians
Queensland; Soccer Football; Association	1941 First Division	Blackstone Rovers
Queensland; Soccer Football; Association	1942 - 1943	No competition due to World War 2
Queensland; Soccer Football; Association	1944 First Division	St. Helens
Queensland; Soccer Football; Association	1945 First Division	St. Helens
Brisbane & Ipswich; Soccer Football; Association	1946 First Division	YMCA
Brisbane & Ipswich; Soccer Football; Association	1947 First Division	St. Helens
Brisbane & Ipswich; Soccer Football; Association	1948 First Division	St. Helens
Brisbane & Ipswich; Soccer Football; Association	1949 First Division	Corinthians
Brisbane & Ipswich; Soccer Football; Association	1950 First Division	Dinmore Bush Rats
Brisbane & Ipswich; Soccer Football; Association	1951 First Division	Eastern Suburbs
Brisbane & Ipswich; Soccer Football; Association	1952 First Division	Corinthians
Brisbane & Ipswich; Soccer Football; Association	1953 First Division	Blackstone Rovers
Brisbane & Ipswich; Soccer Football; Association	1954 First Division	Dinmore Bush Rats
Brisbane & Ipswich; Soccer Football; Association	1955 First Division	Bundamba Rangers
Brisbane & Ipswich; Soccer Football; Association	1956 First Division	St. Helens
Brisbane & Ipswich; Soccer Football; Association	1957 First Division	Bundamba Rangers
Brisbane & Ipswich; Soccer Football; Association	1958 First Division	Oxley United

Governing body	Competition and Year	Premiers	Champions
Brisbane & Ipswich; Soccer Football; Association	1959 First Division	Annerley	Annerley
Brisbane & Ipswich; Soccer Football; Association	1960 First Division	Hellenic	Hellenic
Brisbane & Ipswich; Soccer Football; Association	1961 First Division	Hellenic	Azzurri
Queensland; Soccer Federation	1962 Division 1	Hellenic	Merton Rovers
Queensland; Soccer Federation	1963 Division 1	Hellenic	Hellenic
Queensland; Soccer Federation	1964 Division 1	Latrobe	Merton Rovers
Queensland; Soccer Federation	1965 Division 1	Hellenic	Latrobe
Queensland; Soccer Federation	1966 Division 1	Latrobe	Latrobe
Queensland; Soccer Federation	1967 Division 1	Latrobe	Hollandia-Inala
Queensland; Soccer Federation	1968 Division 1	Hollandia-Inala	Merton Rovers
Queensland; Soccer Federation	1969 Division 1	Hellenic	Hollandia-Inala
Queensland; Soccer Federation	1970 Division 1	Azzurri	Azzurri
Queensland; Soccer Federation	1971 Division 1	Azzurri	Azzurri
Queensland; Soccer Federation	1972 Division 1	Hellenic	Merton-East
Queensland; Soccer Federation	1973 Division 1	Brisbane Lions	Brisbane City
Queensland; Soccer Federation	1974 Division 1	Brisbane Lions	Brisbane City
Queensland; Soccer Federation	1975 Division 1	Brisbane Lions	Brisbane City
Queensland; Soccer Federation	1976 Division 1	Brisbane City	Brisbane City
Queensland; Soccer Federation	1977 Division 1	St George-Souths	Redlands United
Queensland; Soccer Federation	1978 Division 1	Southside Eagles	Southside Eagles
Queensland; Soccer Federation	1979 State League	Grange Thistle	Grange Thistle
Queensland; Soccer Federation	1980 State League	Mount Gravatt	Grange Thistle
Queensland; Soccer Federation	1981 State League	Mount Gravatt	Mount Gravatt
Queensland; Soccer Federation	1982 State League	Townsville United	Ipswich United
Queensland; Soccer Federation	1983 Premier League	Mount Gravatt	Olympic United
Queensland; Soccer Federation	1984 Premier League	Mount Gravatt	Ipswich United
Queensland; Soccer Federation	1985 Premier League	Ipswich United	Ipswich United
Queensland; Soccer Federation	1986 Premier League	North Star	Coalstars
Queensland; Soccer Federation	1987 Premier League	Brisbane Lions	Brisbane Lions
Queensland; Soccer Federation	1988 Premier League	Brisbane City	North Star
Queensland; Soccer Federation	1989 Premier League	North Star	Eastern Suburbs
Queensland; Soccer Federation	1990 Premier League	Brisbane Lions	Brisbane City
Queensland; Soccer Federation	1991 Premier League	Brisbane Lions	Brisbane Lions
Queensland; Soccer Federation	1992 Premier League	North Star	North Star
Queensland; Soccer Federation	1993 Premier League	Taringa Rovers	Rochedale Rovers
Queensland; Soccer Federation	1994 Premier League	North Star	North Star
Queensland; Soccer Federation	1995 Premier League	Brisbane City	Rochedale Rovers
Queensland; Soccer Federation	1996 Premier League	Brisbane Lions	Brisbane Lions
Queensland; Soccer Federation	1997 Premier League	Brisbane City	Brisbane City
Queensland; Soccer Federation	1998 Premier League	Brisbane City	Brisbane Lions
Queensland; Soccer Federation	1999 Premier League	Rochedale Rovers	Brisbane City
Queensland; Soccer Federation	2000 Premier League	Brisbane City	not held
Queensland; Soccer Federation	2001 Premier League	Wynnum District	Brisbane City
Queensland; Soccer Federation	2002 Premier League	Queensland Lions	Queensland Lions
Brisbane; Men's Soccer	2003 Premier League	Queensland Lions	Queensland Lions
Brisbane; Men's Soccer	2004 Premier League	Queensland Lions	Queensland Lions
Brisbane; Men's Soccer	2005 Premier League	Palm Beach	Pine Rivers United
Brisbane; Men's Football	2006 Premier League	Brisbane Strikers	Brisbane Strikers
Football Brisbane	2007 Premier League	Rochedale Rovers	Rochedale Rovers
Football Brisbane	2008 Premier League	Rochedale Rovers	Brisbane City
Football Brisbane	2009 Premier League	Peninsula Power	Brisbane Wolves
Football Brisbane	2010 Premier League	Rochedale Rovers	Brisbane Wolves
Football Brisbane	2011 Premier League	Wolves FC	Rochedale Rovers
Football Brisbane	2012 Premier League	Redlands United	Wolves FC
Football Brisbane	2013 Premier League	Lions FC	Peninsula Power
Football Brisbane	2014 Premier League	Wolves FC	Peninsula Power
Football Brisbane	2015 Premier League	Lions FC	Peninsula Power
Football Brisbane	2016 Premier League	Lions FC	Lions FC
Football Brisbane	2017 Premier League	Rochedale Rovers	Lions FC
Football Brisbane	2018 Premier League	Albany Creek	Grange Thistle
Football Brisbane	2019 Premier League	Albany Creek	Albany Creek
Football Brisbane	2020 Premier League	St George Willawong	– (Note: Awarded as Champions.)
Football Brisbane	2021 Premier League	Albany Creek	Bayside United

^{1} Challenge Cup held as a knockout competition (see section on Charity Cup competition).
^{2} Ipswich and West Moreton Association competition continued during these seasons.
^{3} Competition restricted to Second and Third Divisions and Junior competitions.

References :

== Media ==
The league and its lower divisions are covered by several local newspapers throughout the city, suburbs and surrounding areas including Ipswich and Toowoomba. Highlights of matches, often at least 2 matches per round, in the league are put together by FB Media (the Media arm of Football Brisbane). Live scores and updates from all Brisbane Premier League matches can be found on The Washing Line Facebook page. The Washing Line website also publishes reports, previews and newspaper articles from around the city. The website built upon the Unofficial site YourBPL.com which began media coverage of the league in 2007. From 2012, the newly founded 'FB Media' has been producing weekly podcasts which can be downloaded from The Washing Line website featuring prominent guests including James Meyer, Miron Bleiberg, Matt Mundy and a wide variety of coaches and players from the Brisbane Premier League. Some games are covered by PaulyTV and FBTV.

=== Media milestones ===
- On Sunday 23 May 2010, a match between Brisbane Wolves and Pine Rivers United became the first BPL match to be streamed live on the internet. Wolves won 5–2.
- On Saturday 11 June 2011, a match between Redlands United and Olympic FC featured on The Danny Baker Show in the UK, on BBC Radio 5 Live. Olympic won 3–2.
- At the end of the 2011 season following the success of Wolves FC, 18 goal centreback Patrick Hopkins was scouted via FBTV match highlights for Ljungskile SK in Sweden. In need of a forward, the league's top scorer Steffen Vroom soon followed.

== Sponsors ==
From 2014 to 2015 the Brisbane Premier League was known as the Trophy Superstore Premier League.

2014 - 2015 Trophy Superstore Premier League Logo

This changed in 2016 when Flight Centre became the league sponsors, thus known as the Flight Centre Premier League.

== See also ==
- Football Queensland Metro
- Football Queensland Premier League 2
- Football Queensland Premier League 3 − Darling Downs
- Football Queensland Premier League 3 − South Coast
- Football Queensland Premier League 3 − Sunshine Coast
- Football Queensland Premier League 4 – Metro
