= 2019 in Queensland soccer =

Football Queensland
- Season: 2019

The 2019 Football Queensland season was the seventh season since NPL Queensland commenced as the top tier of Queensland men’s football. This season was also the second season of the Football Queensland Premier League which occupied the second tier in Queensland men’s football in 2019.

Below NPL Queensland and the FQPL was a regional structure of ten zones with their own leagues. The strongest of the zones was Football Brisbane with its senior men’s competition consisting of four divisions.

The NPL Queensland premiers qualified for the National Premier Leagues finals series, competing with the other state federation champions in a final knockout tournament to decide the National Premier Leagues Champion for 2019.

== Men's League Tables ==
=== 2019 National Premier League Queensland ===
NPL Queensland
- Season: 2019
- Champions: Gold Coast Knights
- Premiers: Lions FC
- Relegated: Western Pride; South West Queensland Thunder; Sunshine Coast
- Matches: 210
- Goals: 896 (4.27 per match)

The National Premier League Queensland 2019 season was played over 28 matches, followed by a finals series.

Pos	Team	Pld	W	D	L	GF	GA	GD	Pts	Qualification or relegation
1	Lions FC	28	24	2	2	89	20	+69	74	2019 National Premier Leagues Finals
2	Gold Coast Knights (C)	28	22	4	2	77	22	+55	70	2019 Queensland Finals
3	Peninsula Power	28	23	0	5	84	37	+47	69	2019 Queensland Finals
4	Olympic FC	28	18	3	7	85	43	+42	57	2019 Queensland Finals
5	Brisbane Strikers	28	14	4	10	79	50	+29	46	
6	Brisbane City	28	12	3	13	61	56	+5	39	
7	Gold Coast United	28	11	4	13	45	51	−6	37	
8	Brisbane Roar Youth	28	11	3	14	62	58	+4	36	
9	Eastern Suburbs	28	11	3	14	67	66	+1	36	
10	Redlands United	28	11	2	15	47	72	−25	35	
11	Moreton Bay United	28	10	4	14	47	51	−4	34	
12	Magpies Crusaders United	28	7	5	16	43	104	−61	26	
13	Western Pride (R)	28	8	1	19	37	70	−33	25	Relegation to the 2020 Queensland Premier League
14	South West Queensland Thunder (R)	28	5	3	20	50	104	−54	18	Relegation to the 2020 Queensland Premier League
15	Sunshine Coast (R)	28	2	1	25	25	94	−69	7	Relegation to the 2020 Queensland Premier League

Source: sportstg.com
Rules for classification: 1) points; 2) goal difference; 3) number of goals scored.
(C) Champions; (R) Relegated

==== Finals ====
Semi-finals
2	Gold Coast Knights	2
3	Peninsula Power	1
1	Lions FC	1
4	Olympic FC	2

Grand Final
2	Gold Coast Knights	2
4	Olympic FC	1

=== 2019 Football Queensland Premier League ===
Football Queensland Premier League
- Season: 2019
- Champions: Rochedale Rovers
- Premiers: Sunshine Coast Wanderers
- Promoted: Sunshine Coast Wanderers; Capalaba
- Relegated: No relegation
- Matches: 90
- Goals: 394 (4.38 per match)

The 2019 Football Queensland Premier League was the second edition of the Football Queensland Premier League and is the second level domestic association football competition in Queensland.

Pos	Team	Pld	W	D	L	GF	GA	GD	Pts	Qualification or relegation
1	Sunshine Coast Wanderers (P)	18	13	2	3	52	23	+29	41	Promoted to 2020 NPL Queensland; 2019 FQPL Finals
2	Capalaba (P)	18	12	2	4	48	26	+22	38	Promoted to 2020 NPL Queensland; 2019 FQPL Finals
3	Logan Lightning	18	12	1	5	52	26	+26	37	2019 FQPL Finals
4	Rochedale Rovers (C)	18	9	3	6	49	37	+12	30	2019 FQPL Finals
5	Mitchelton	18	9	3	6	44	32	+12	30	2019 FQPL Finals
6	Ipswich Knights	18	8	4	6	35	31	+4	28	2019 FQPL Finals
7	Wolves FC	18	5	4	9	32	44	−12	19	
8	Souths United	18	4	1	13	29	59	−30	13	
9	Southside Eagles	18	3	3	12	22	46	−24	12	
10	Holland Park	18	3	1	14	31	70	−39	10	

Source: sportstg.com
Rules for classification: 1) points; 2) goal difference; 3) number of goals scored.
(C) Champions; (P) Promoted

==== Finals ====
Elimination-finals
Logan Lightning	1
Ipswich Knights	2
Rochedale Rovers	3
Mitchelton	2

Semi-finals
Sunshine Coast Wanderers	2
Ipswich Knights	1
Capalaba	1
Rochedale Rovers	3

Grand Final
Sunshine Coast Wanderers	1
Rochedale Rovers	2

=== 2019 Brisbane Premier League ===
Brisbane Premier League
- Season: 2019
- Champions: Grange Thistle
- Premiers: Albany Creek
- Relegated: Mount Gravatt; Virginia United
- Matches: 132
- Goals: 551 (4.17 per match)

The 2019 Brisbane Premier League was the 37th edition of the Brisbane Premier League which was the third level domestic association football competition in Queensland in 2019.

Pos	Team	Pld	W	D	L	GF	GA	GD	Pts	Qualification or relegation
1	Albany Creek (C, P)	22	16	4	2	63	20	+43	52	2019 BPL Finals
2	Toowong	22	15	4	3	68	38	+30	49	2019 BPL Finals
3	Taringa Rovers	22	14	4	4	54	24	+30	46	2019 BPL Finals
4	Bayside United	22	14	3	5	58	37	+21	45	2019 BPL Finals
5	Grange Thistle	22	13	5	4	55	33	+22	44	
6	The Gap	22	9	5	8	54	52	+2	32	
7	Caboolture Sports	22	10	1	11	49	46	+3	31	
8	Acacia Ridge	22	6	2	14	27	41	−14	20	
9	Brisbane Knights	22	6	1	15	43	66	−23	19	
10	Centenary Stormers	22	4	4	14	34	65	−31	16	
11	UQ FC (R)	22	4	3	15	25	45	−20	15	Relegated to 2020 Capital League 1
12	North Pine (R)	22	3	0	19	21	84	−63	9	Relegated to 2020 Capital League 1

Source: sportstg.com
Rules for classification: 1) points; 2) goal difference; 3) number of goals scored.
(C) Champions; (P) Promoted; (R) Relegated

==== Finals ====
Semi-finals
1	Albany Creek	1
2	Toowong	2
3	Taringa Rovers	0
4	Bayside United	1

Preliminary Final
1	Albany Creek	3
4	Bayside United	1

Grand Final
2	Toowong	0
1	Albany Creek	2

=== 2019 Capital League 1 ===
Capital League 1
- Season: 2019
- Champions: AC Carina
- Premiers: St. George Willawong
- Promoted: St. George Willawong; North Star
- Relegated: Moggill; Pine Hills
- Matches: 132
- Goals: 521 (3.95 per match)

The 2019 Capital League 1 season was the seventh edition of Capital League 1 which was the fourth level domestic association football competition in Queensland in 2019. 12 teams competed, all playing each other twice for a total of 22 matches.

Pos	Team	Pld	W	D	L	GF	GA	GD	Pts	Qualification or relegation
1	St. George Willawong (P)	22	17	2	3	44	20	+24	53	Promoted to 2020 Brisbane Premier League; 2019 CL1 Finals
2	North Star (P)	22	14	3	5	61	40	+21	45	Promoted to 2020 Brisbane Premier League; 2019 CL1 Finals
3	AC Carina (C)	22	14	3	5	49	28	+21	45	2019 CL1 Finals
4	Western Spirit	22	11	5	6	37	32	+5	38	2019 CL1 Finals
5	Annerley	22	12	1	9	50	37	+13	37	
6	Ipswich City	22	11	3	8	48	32	+16	36	
7	Samford Rangers	22	9	3	10	50	49	+1	30	
8	Mount Gravatt	22	8	4	10	40	37	+3	28	
9	New Farm United	22	7	2	13	45	47	−2	23	
10	Virginia United	22	7	2	13	39	48	−9	23	
11	Moggill (R)	22	4	4	14	35	62	−27	16	Relegated to 2020 Capital League 2
12	Pine Hills (R)	22	1	2	19	23	89	−66	5	Relegated to 2020 Capital League 2

Source: sportstg.com
Rules for classification: 1) points; 2) goal difference; 3) number of goals scored.
(C) Champions; (P) Promoted; (R) Relegated

==== Finals ====
Semi-finals
1	St. George Willawong	3
2	North Star	0
3	AC Carina	1
4	Western Spirit	0

Preliminary Final
2	North Star	1
3	AC Carina	3

Grand Final
1	St. George Willawong	2
3	AC Carina	3

=== 2019 Capital League 2 ===
Capital League 2
- Season: 2019
- Champions: Brisbane Athletic
- Premiers: The Lakes
- Promoted: The Lakes; Brisbane Athletic
- Relegated: Tarragindi Tigers; Park Ridge
- Matches: 132
- Goals: 489 (3.7 per match)

The 2019 Capital League 2 season was the seventh edition of Capital League 2 which was the fifth level domestic association football competition in Queensland in 2019. 12 teams competed, all playing each other twice for a total of 22 matches.

Pos	Team	Pld	W	D	L	GF	GA	GD	Pts	Qualification or relegation
1	The Lakes (P)	22	16	3	3	49	26	+23	51	Promoted to 2020 Capital League 1; 2019 CL2 Finals
2	Brisbane Athletic (C, P)	22	14	3	5	83	26	+57	45	Promoted to 2020 Capital League 1; 2019 CL2 Finals
3	Westside	22	13	2	7	43	30	+13	41	2019 CL2 Finals
4	Kangaroo Point Rovers	22	11	6	5	38	35	+3	39	2019 CL2 Finals
5	Newmarket	22	10	6	6	39	18	+21	36	
6	North Brisbane	22	10	3	9	50	36	+14	33	
7	Slacks Creek	22	10	3	9	45	31	+14	33	
8	Clairvaux	22	8	5	9	30	37	−7	29	
9	Bardon Latrobe	22	8	2	12	32	46	−14	26	
10	Oxley United	22	7	3	12	35	53	−18	24	
11	Tarragindi Tigers (R)	22	4	0	18	26	77	−51	12	Relegated to 2020 Capital League 3
12	Park Ridge (R)	22	2	2	18	19	74	−55	8	Relegated to 2020 Capital League 3

Source: sportstg.com
Rules for classification: 1) points; 2) goal difference; 3) number of goals scored.
(C) Champions; (P) Promoted; (R) Relegated

==== Finals ====
Semi-finals
1	The Lakes	1
2	Brisbane Athletic	0
3	Westside	0
4	Kangaroo Point Rovers	1

Preliminary Final
2	Brisbane Athletic	5
4	Kangaroo Point Rovers	1

Grand Final
1	The Lakes	0
2	Brisbane Athletic	2

=== 2019 Capital League 3 ===
Capital League 3
- Season: 2019
- Champions: Ripley Valley
- Premiers: Logan Metro
- Promoted: Logan Metro; Ripley Valley
- Matches: 110
- Goals: 613 (5.57 per match)

The 2019 Capital League 3 season was the seventh edition of Capital League 3 which was the sixth level domestic association football competition in Queensland in 2019. 11 teams competed, all playing each other twice for a total of 20 matches.

Pos	Team	Pld	W	D	L	GF	GA	GD	Pts	Qualification or relegation
1	Logan Metro (P)	20	16	2	2	93	15	+78	50	Promoted to 2020 Capital League 2; 2019 CL3 Finals
2	Ripley Valley (C, P)	20	15	2	3	86	24	+62	47	Promoted to 2020 Capital League 2; 2019 CL3 Finals
3	Bethania Rams	20	13	3	4	77	32	+45	42	2019 CL3 Finals
4	Jimboomba United	20	12	1	7	60	37	+23	37	2019 CL3 Finals
5	Ridge Hills United	20	11	1	8	65	47	+18	34	
6	Springfield United	20	10	3	7	57	37	+20	33	
7	North Lakes Mustangs	20	9	3	8	41	50	−9	30	
8	Logan Roos	20	7	0	13	47	79	−32	21	
9	Redcliffe PCYC	20	5	2	13	37	64	−27	17	
10	Logan Village	20	3	1	16	30	71	−41	10	
11	Teviot Downs	20	0	0	20	20	157	−137	0	

Source: sportstg.com
Rules for classification: 1) points; 2) goal difference; 3) number of goals scored.
(C) Champions; (P) Promoted

==== Finals ====
Semi-finals
1	Logan Metro	3
2	Ripley Valley	0
3	Bethania Rams	2
4	Jimboomba United	0

Preliminary Final
2	Ripley Valley	4
3	Bethania Rams	0

Grand Final
1	Logan Metro	0
2	Ripley Valley	4

== Women's League Tables ==
=== 2019 Women's NPL Queensland ===
Women's NPL Queensland
- Season: 2019
- Champions: Lions FC
- Premiers: Lions FC
- Matches: 156
- Goals: 809 (5.19 per match)

The 2019 Women's NPL Queensland season was the fifth edition of the Women's NPL Queensland as the top level domestic football of women's competition in Queensland. 13 teams competed, all playing each other twice for a total of 24 matches.

Pos	Team	Pld	W	D	L	GF	GA	GD	Pts	Qualification or relegation
1	Lions FC (C)	24	19	4	1	108	22	+86	61	2019 Women's NPL Qld Finals
2	Moreton Bay United	24	18	2	4	108	30	+78	56	2019 Women's NPL Qld Finals
3	The Gap	24	15	4	5	83	28	+55	49	2019 Women's NPL Qld Finals
4	Gold Coast United	24	14	5	5	73	36	+37	47	2019 Women's NPL Qld Finals
5	Capalaba	24	14	3	7	76	32	+44	45	
6	Eastern Suburbs	24	13	3	8	54	40	+14	42	
7	Souths United	24	13	2	9	78	38	+40	41	
8	Logan Lightning	24	12	4	8	79	51	+28	40	
9	Mitchelton	24	6	3	15	30	80	−50	21	
10	Brisbane Roar/NTC	24	5	2	17	40	100	−60	17	
11	Western Pride	24	3	2	19	28	98	−70	11	
12	Sunshine Coast Wanderers	24	3	2	19	20	98	−78	11	
13	South West Queensland Thunder	24	2	2	20	32	156	−124	8	

Source: sportstg.com
Rules for classification: 1) points; 2) goal difference; 3) number of goals scored.
(C) Champions

==== Finals ====
Semi-finals
1	Lions FC	1 (4)
4	Gold Coast United	1 (2)
2	Moreton Bay United	2
3	The Gap	1

Grand Final
1	Lions FC	3
2	Moreton Bay United	1

=== 2019 Brisbane Women’s Premier League ===
Brisbane Women's Premier League
- Season: 2019
- Champions: Peninsula Power
- Premiers: The Lakes
- Matches: 132
- Goals: 627 (4.75 per match)

The 2019 Brisbane Women’s Premier League was the second level domestic association football competition in Queensland in 2019. It was expanded this season to include four teams from the Gold Coast (Broadbeach United, Robina City, Southport and Coomera) to make up a 12 team competition.

Pos	Team	Pld	W	D	L	GF	GA	GD	Pts	Qualification or relegation
1	The Lakes	22	17	2	3	73	20	+53	53	2019 BPL Finals
2	UQ FC	22	14	4	4	46	19	+27	46	2019 BPL Finals
3	Peninsula Power (C)	22	11	7	4	78	34	+44	40	2019 BPL Finals
4	Coomera	22	11	5	6	56	38	+18	38	2019 BPL Finals
5	Annerley	22	11	3	8	70	49	+21	36	
6	Virginia United	22	11	3	8	55	39	+16	36	
7	Robina City	22	10	4	8	59	53	+6	34	
8	Southport	22	9	3	10	69	52	+17	30	
9	Broadbeach United	22	9	3	10	39	31	+8	30	
10	Ipswich City	22	9	1	12	62	48	+14	28	
11	Taringa Rovers	22	1	2	19	11	110	−99	5	
12	North Brisbane	22	0	1	21	9	134	−125	1	

Source: sportstg.com
Rules for classification: 1) points; 2) goal difference; 3) number of goals scored.
(C) Champions

==== Finals ====
Semi-finals
1	The Lakes	2
2	UQ FC	0
3	Peninsula Power	4
4	Coomera	0

Preliminary Final
2	UQ FC	1
3	Peninsula Power	2

Grand Final
1	The Lakes	1
3	Peninsula Power	2

== Cup Competitions ==
=== 2019 Canale Cup ===
Brisbane-based soccer clubs competed in 2019 for the Canale Cup, known for sponsorship reasons as the 2019 Pig 'N' Whistle Canale Cup. Clubs entered from the Brisbane Premier League, the Capital League 1, Capital League 2 and Capital League 3.

This knockout competition was won by Grange Thistle.

=== FFA Cup Qualifiers ===
Queensland-based soccer clubs competed in 2019 in the preliminary rounds for the 2019 FFA Cup. The four winners of Seventh Round qualified for the final rounds of the FFA Cup; Magpies Crusaders United representing Central and North Queensland, with Brisbane Strikers, Coomera Colts and Olympic FC representing South East Queensland. In addition, A-League club Brisbane Roar qualified for the final rounds, entering at the Round of 32.

=== 2019 City League Cup ===
This knockout competition was won by the Capalaba Bulldogs City League 1 team.
