= 2018 in Queensland soccer =

Football Queensland
- Season: 2018

The 2018 Football Queensland season was the sixth season since NPL Queensland commenced as the top tier of Queensland men's football. This season was also the initial season of the Football Queensland Premier League which occupied the second tier in Queensland men's football in 2018.

Below NPL Queensland and the FQPL was a regional structure of ten zones with their own leagues. The strongest of the zones was Football Brisbane with its senior men's competition consisting of four divisions.

The NPL Queensland premiers qualified for the National Premier Leagues finals series, competing with the other state federation champions in a final knockout tournament to decide the National Premier Leagues Champion for 2018.

== Men's League Tables ==
=== 2018 National Premier League Queensland ===
NPL Queensland
- Season: 2018
- Champions: Lions FC
- Premiers: Lions FC
- Relegated: no relegation
- Matches: 182
- Goals: 775 (4.26 per match)
- Top goalscorer: Dylan Wenzel-Halls (25 goals)
- Biggest home win: Western Pride 15-1 Sunshine Coast (3 March 2018)
- Biggest away win: Sunshine Coast 0-7 Western Pride (23 June 2018)
- Highest scoring: Western Pride 15-1 Sunshine Coast (3 March 2018)

The National Premier League Queensland 2018 season was played over 26 matches, followed by a finals series.

| Pos | Team | Pld | W | D | L | GF | GA | GD | Pts | Qualification or relegation |
|---|---|---|---|---|---|---|---|---|---|---|
| 1 | Lions FC (C) | 26 | 23 | 0 | 3 | 84 | 11 | +73 | 69 | 2018 National Premier Leagues Finals |
| 2 | Olympic FC | 26 | 19 | 5 | 2 | 74 | 26 | +48 | 62 | 2018 Queensland Finals |
| 3 | Western Pride | 26 | 19 | 0 | 7 | 96 | 33 | +63 | 57 | 2018 Queensland Finals |
| 4 | Moreton Bay United | 26 | 17 | 4 | 5 | 60 | 35 | +25 | 55 | 2018 Queensland Finals |
| 5 | Brisbane Strikers | 26 | 16 | 2 | 8 | 74 | 31 | +43 | 50 | |
| 6 | Brisbane City | 26 | 13 | 4 | 9 | 69 | 48 | +21 | 43 | |
| 7 | South West Queensland Thunder | 26 | 10 | 4 | 12 | 46 | 60 | −14 | 34 | |
| 8 | Cairns FC | 26 | 9 | 3 | 14 | 44 | 62 | −18 | 30 | Withdrew at end of season. (Note: Cairns and North Queensland United relinquished their NPL Queensland licence at the end of the season.) |
| 9 | Brisbane Roar Youth | 26 | 8 | 4 | 14 | 35 | 59 | −24 | 28 | |
| 10 | Gold Coast United | 26 | 8 | 3 | 15 | 38 | 67 | −29 | 27 | |
| 11 | Magpies Crusaders United | 26 | 8 | 1 | 17 | 48 | 74 | −26 | 25 | |
| 12 | Redlands United | 26 | 7 | 2 | 17 | 52 | 81 | −29 | 23 | |
| 13 | North Queensland United | 26 | 6 | 1 | 19 | 35 | 71 | −36 | 19 | Withdrew at end of season. (Note: Cairns and North Queensland United relinquished their NPL Queensland licence at the end of the season.) |
| 14 | Sunshine Coast | 26 | 1 | 3 | 22 | 20 | 117 | −97 | 6 (Note: Sunshine Coast was reprieved from relegation following the withdrawal of Cairns FC and North Queensland United.) | |

Source: sportstg.com
Rules for classification: 1) points; 2) goal difference; 3) number of goals scored.
(C) Champions

==== Finals ====
Semi-finals
1 | Lions FC | 1 (3)
4 | Moreton Bay United | 1 (1)
2 | Olympic FC | 2
3 | Western Pride | 1

Grand Final
1 | Lions FC (a.e.t.) | 2
2 | Olympic FC | 1

=== 2018 Football Queensland Premier League ===
Football Queensland Premier League
- Season: 2018
- Champions: Peninsula Power
- Premiers: Peninsula Power
- Promoted: Peninsula Power; Eastern Suburbs
- Relegated: No relegation
- Matches: 156
- Goals: 719 (4.61 per match)
- Top goalscorer: Youeil Shol (35 goals)
- Biggest home win: Eastern Suburbs 10-1 Wide Bay Buccaneers (4 August 2018)
- Biggest away win: Wide Bay Buccaneers 0-12 Peninsula Power (7 July 2018)
- Highest scoring: Wide Bay Buccaneers 0-12 Peninsula Power (7 July 2018)

The 2018 Football Queensland Premier League was the first edition of the Football Queensland Premier League and is the second level domestic association football competition in Queensland.

| Pos | Team | Pld | W | D | L | GF | GA | GD | Pts | Qualification or relegation |
|---|---|---|---|---|---|---|---|---|---|---|
| 1 | Peninsula Power (C, P) | 24 | 23 | 1 | 0 | 108 | 17 | +91 | 70 | Promoted to 2019 NPL Queensland; 2018 FQPL Finals |
| 2 | Eastern Suburbs (P) | 24 | 16 | 2 | 6 | 95 | 47 | +48 | 50 | Promoted to 2019 NPL Queensland; 2018 FQPL Finals |
| 3 | Logan Lightning | 24 | 14 | 4 | 6 | 60 | 39 | +21 | 46 | 2018 FQPL Finals |
| 4 | Souths United | 24 | 13 | 5 | 6 | 66 | 36 | +30 | 44 | 2018 FQPL Finals |
| 5 | Sunshine Coast Wanderers | 24 | 13 | 5 | 6 | 55 | 27 | +28 | 44 | |
| 6 | Rochedale Rovers | 24 | 12 | 5 | 7 | 52 | 52 | 0 | 41 | |
| 7 | Mitchelton | 24 | 10 | 2 | 12 | 49 | 47 | +2 | 32 | |
| 8 | Capalaba | 24 | 8 | 5 | 11 | 49 | 55 | −6 | 29 | |
| 9 | Wolves FC | 24 | 8 | 4 | 12 | 48 | 63 | −15 | 28 | |
| 10 | Holland Park | 24 | 8 | 1 | 15 | 53 | 69 | −16 | 25 | |
| 11 | Southside Eagles | 24 | 7 | 3 | 14 | 36 | 59 | −23 | 24 | |
| 12 | Ipswich Knights | 24 | 3 | 5 | 16 | 32 | 68 | −36 | 14 | |
| 13 | Wide Bay Buccaneers | 24 | 0 | 0 | 24 | 16 | 140 | −124 | 0 | |

Source: sportstg.com
Rules for classification: 1) points; 2) goal difference; 3) number of goals scored.
(C) Champions; (P) Promoted

==== Finals ====
Semi-finals
1 | Peninsula Power | 3
4 | Souths United | 0
2 | Eastern Suburbs | 3
3 | Logan Lightning | 0

Grand Final
1 | Peninsula Power | 2
2 | Eastern Suburbs | 0

=== 2018 Brisbane Premier League ===
Brisbane Premier League
- Season: 2018
- Champions: Grange Thistle
- Premiers: Albany Creek
- Relegated: Mount Gravatt; Virginia United
- Matches: 132
- Goals: 440 (3.33 per match)
- Top goalscorer: Youngnam Kim (17 goals).
- Biggest home win: North Pine 7-1 Virginia United (11 August 2018)
- Biggest away win: Brisbane Knights 0-4 Grange Thistle (22 June 2018); North Pine 1-5 Centenary Stormers (1 July 2018); Acacia Ridge 0-4 Taringa Rovers (25 August 2018)
- Highest scoring: North Pine 7-1 Virginia United (11 August 2018)

The 2018 Brisbane Premier League was the 36th edition of the Brisbane Premier League which became a third level domestic association football competition in Queensland with the formation of the Football Queensland Premier League in 2018.

| Pos | Team | Pld | W | D | L | GF | GA | GD | Pts | Qualification or relegation |
|---|---|---|---|---|---|---|---|---|---|---|
| 1 | Albany Creek | 22 | 15 | 6 | 1 | 53 | 23 | +30 | 51 | 2018 BPL Finals |
| 2 | Grange Thistle (C) | 22 | 12 | 5 | 5 | 46 | 21 | +25 | 41 | 2018 BPL Finals |
| 3 | UQ FC | 22 | 12 | 3 | 7 | 43 | 33 | +10 | 39 | 2018 BPL Finals |
| 4 | The Gap | 22 | 11 | 3 | 8 | 35 | 35 | 0 | 36 | 2018 BPL Finals |
| 5 | Taringa Rovers | 22 | 9 | 8 | 5 | 37 | 29 | +8 | 35 | |
| 6 | Centenary Stormers | 22 | 10 | 4 | 8 | 39 | 35 | +4 | 34 | |
| 7 | North Pine | 22 | 9 | 4 | 9 | 44 | 42 | +2 | 31 | |
| 8 | Bayside United | 22 | 8 | 6 | 8 | 34 | 28 | +6 | 30 | |
| 9 | Brisbane Knights | 22 | 7 | 4 | 11 | 34 | 46 | −12 | 25 | |
| 10 | Acacia Ridge | 22 | 7 | 1 | 14 | 31 | 44 | −13 | 22 | |
| 11 | Mount Gravatt (R) | 22 | 3 | 4 | 15 | 17 | 46 | −29 | 13 | Relegated to 2019 Capital League 1 |
| 12 | Virginia United (R) | 22 | 2 | 6 | 14 | 27 | 58 | −31 | 12 | Relegated to 2019 Capital League 1 |

Source: sportstg.com
Rules for classification: 1) points; 2) goal difference; 3) number of goals scored.
(C) Champions; (R) Relegated

==== Finals ====
Semi-finals
1 | Albany Creek | 5
2 | Grange Thistle | 1
3 | UQ FC | 2 (2)
4 | The Gap | 2 (4)

Preliminary Final
2 | Grange Thistle (a.e.t.) | 1
4 | The Gap | 0

Grand Final
1 | Albany Creek | 1
2 | Grange Thistle | 5

=== 2018 Capital League 1 ===
Capital League 1
- Season: 2018
- Champions: Toowong
- Premiers: Caboolture Sports
- Promoted: Caboolture Sports; Toowong
- Relegated: Oxley United; Park Ridge
- Matches: 132
- Goals: 658 (4.98 per match)
- Top goalscorer: Diego Barbieri (24 goals)
- Biggest home win: St. George Willawong 13-1 Park Ridge (13 July 2018)
- Biggest away win: Park Ridge 0-9 North Star (25 August 2018)
- Highest scoring: St. George Willawong 13-1 Park Ridge (13 July 2018)

The 2018 Capital League 1 season was the sixth edition of Capital League 1 which became a fourth level domestic association football competition in Queensland with the formation of the Football Queensland Premier League in 2018.12 teams competed, all playing each other twice for a total of 22 matches.

| Pos | Team | Pld | W | D | L | GF | GA | GD | Pts | Qualification or relegation |
|---|---|---|---|---|---|---|---|---|---|---|
| 1 | Caboolture Sports (P) | 22 | 18 | 3 | 1 | 76 | 14 | +62 | 57 | Promoted to 2019 Brisbane Premier League; 2018 CL1 Finals |
| 2 | Toowong (C, P) | 22 | 16 | 3 | 3 | 72 | 25 | +47 | 51 | Promoted to 2019 Brisbane Premier League; 2018 CL1 Finals |
| 3 | Annerley | 22 | 14 | 1 | 7 | 76 | 45 | +31 | 43 | 2018 CL1 Finals |
| 4 | North Star | 22 | 13 | 3 | 6 | 76 | 37 | +39 | 42 | 2018 CL1 Finals |
| 5 | Ipswich City | 22 | 10 | 4 | 8 | 53 | 44 | +9 | 34 | |
| 6 | St. George Willawong | 22 | 10 | 3 | 9 | 56 | 54 | +2 | 33 | |
| 7 | Moggill | 22 | 10 | 2 | 10 | 52 | 59 | −7 | 32 | |
| 8 | Pine Hills | 22 | 9 | 1 | 12 | 60 | 59 | +1 | 28 | |
| 9 | New Farm United | 22 | 7 | 5 | 10 | 44 | 53 | −9 | 26 | |
| 10 | Western Spirit | 22 | 7 | 1 | 14 | 51 | 58 | −7 | 22 | |
| 11 | Oxley United (R) | 22 | 4 | 2 | 16 | 31 | 70 | −39 | 14 | Relegated to 2019 Capital League 2 |
| 12 | Park Ridge (R) | 22 | 0 | 0 | 22 | 11 | 140 | −129 | 0 | Relegated to 2019 Capital League 2 |

Source: sportstg.com
Rules for classification: 1) points; 2) goal difference; 3) number of goals scored.
(C) Champions; (P) Promoted; (R) Relegated

==== Finals ====
Semi-finals
1 | Caboolture Sports | 2
2 | Toowong | 1
3 | Annerley | 4
4 | North Star | 0

Preliminary Final
2 | Toowong | 4
3 | Annerley | 2

Grand Final
1 | Caboolture Sports | 0 (2)
2 | Toowong | 0 (4)

=== 2018 Capital League 2 ===
Capital League 2
- Season: 2018
- Champions: AC Carina
- Premiers: AC Carina
- Promoted: AC Carina; Samford Rangers
- Matches: 110
- Goals: 438 (3.98 per match)
- Top goalscorer: Kevin Barraclough (19 goals)
- Biggest home win: AC Carina 7-0 Narangba United (27 March 2018)
- Biggest away win: Narangba United 0-10 Samford Rangers (4 August 2018)
- Highest scoring: Narangba United 0-10 Samford Rangers (4 August 2018)

The 2018 Capital League 2 season was the sixth edition of Capital League 2 which became a fifth level domestic association football competition in Queensland with the formation of the Football Queensland Premier League in 2018. Following the withdrawal of Redcliffe PCYC prior to the start of the season, the league comprised 11 teams which played each other twice for a total of 20 matches.

| Pos | Team | Pld | W | D | L | GF | GA | GD | Pts | Qualification or relegation |
|---|---|---|---|---|---|---|---|---|---|---|
| 1 | AC Carina (C, P) | 20 | 15 | 5 | 0 | 63 | 20 | +43 | 50 | Promoted to 2019 Capital League 1; 2018 CL2 Finals |
| 2 | Samford Rangers (P) | 20 | 13 | 2 | 5 | 60 | 24 | +36 | 41 | Promoted to 2019 Capital League 1; 2018 CL2 Finals |
| 3 | Clairvaux | 20 | 12 | 2 | 6 | 44 | 21 | +23 | 38 | 2018 CL2 Finals |
| 4 | Westside | 20 | 10 | 5 | 5 | 36 | 25 | +11 | 35 | 2018 CL2 Finals |
| 5 | North Brisbane | 20 | 8 | 5 | 7 | 40 | 29 | +11 | 29 | |
| 6 | Newmarket | 20 | 9 | 2 | 9 | 39 | 35 | +4 | 29 | |
| 7 | Bardon Latrobe | 20 | 8 | 2 | 10 | 37 | 46 | −9 | 26 | |
| 8 | Kangaroo Point Rovers | 20 | 7 | 3 | 10 | 37 | 51 | −14 | 24 | |
| 9 | Tarragindi Tigers | 20 | 6 | 2 | 12 | 33 | 52 | −19 | 20 | |
| 10 | Slacks Creek | 20 | 5 | 1 | 14 | 35 | 50 | −15 | 16 | |
| 11 | Narangba United | 20 | 2 | 1 | 17 | 14 | 85 | −71 | 7 | Withdrew at end of season |

Source: sportstg.com
Rules for classification: 1) points; 2) goal difference; 3) number of goals scored.
(C) Champions; (P) Promoted

==== Finals ====
Semi-finals
1 | AC Carina | 1
2 | Samford Rangers | 0
3 | Ipswich City | 0
4 | Westside | 1

Preliminary Final
2 | Samford Rangers | 3
4 | Westside | 0

Grand Final
1 | AC Carina | 1
2 | Samford Rangers | 0

=== 2018 Capital League 3 ===
Capital League 3
- Season: 2018
- Champions: The Lakes
- Premiers: The Lakes
- Promoted: The Lakes; Brisbane Athletic
- Matches: 109
- Goals: 584 (5.36 per match)
- Top goalscorer: Murilo Oliveira (37 goals)
- Biggest home win: Brisbane Athletic 17-1 Logan Roos (15 July 2018)
- Biggest away win: Mooroondu 0-12 The Lakes (4 August 2018)
- Highest scoring: Brisbane Athletic 17-1 Logan Roos (15 July 2018)

The 2018 Capital League 3 season was the sixth edition of Capital League 3 which became a sixth level domestic association football competition in Queensland with the formation of the Football Queensland Premier League in 2018. 11 teams competed, all playing each other twice for a total of 20 matches.

| Pos | Team | Pld | W | D | L | GF | GA | GD | Pts | Qualification or relegation |
|---|---|---|---|---|---|---|---|---|---|---|
| 1 | The Lakes (C, P) | 20 | 17 | 1 | 2 | 84 | 16 | +68 | 52 | Promoted to 2019 Capital League 2; 2018 CL3 Finals |
| 2 | Brisbane Athletic (P) | 20 | 15 | 1 | 4 | 96 | 35 | +61 | 46 | Promoted to 2019 Capital League 2; 2018 CL3 Finals |
| 3 | Jimboomba United | 19 | 13 | 0 | 6 | 68 | 37 | +31 | 39 (Note: The Round 20 fixture between Mooroondu and Jimboomba United was abandoned due to lighting issues. FB declared the game a no-result.) | 2018 CL3 Finals |
| 4 | Ridge Hills United | 20 | 12 | 2 | 6 | 58 | 38 | +20 | 38 | 2018 CL3 Finals |
| 5 | Logan Metro | 20 | 10 | 5 | 5 | 61 | 30 | +31 | 35 | |
| 6 | Bethania Rams | 20 | 10 | 3 | 7 | 47 | 37 | +10 | 33 | |
| 7 | Springfield United | 20 | 6 | 3 | 11 | 39 | 44 | −5 | 21 | |
| 8 | Logan Roos | 20 | 6 | 1 | 13 | 47 | 83 | −36 | 19 | |
| 9 | Logan City Kings | 20 | 5 | 1 | 14 | 34 | 88 | −54 | 16 | |
| 10 | Logan Village | 20 | 2 | 3 | 15 | 27 | 80 | −53 | 9 | |
| 11 | Mooroondu | 19 | 1 | 4 | 14 | 23 | 96 | −73 | 7 | |

Source: sportstg.com
Rules for classification: 1) points; 2) goal difference; 3) number of goals scored.
(C) Champions; (P) Promoted

==== Finals ====
Semi-finals
1 | The Lakes | 1
2 | Brisbane Athletic | 4
3 | Jimboomba United | 1
4 | Ridge Hills United | 3

Preliminary Final
1 | The Lakes | 4
4 | Ridge Hills United | 2

Grand Final
2 | Brisbane Athletic | 1
1 | The Lakes | 4

== Women's League Tables ==
=== 2018 Women's NPL Queensland ===
Women's NPL Queensland
- Season: 2018
- Champions: Brisbane Roar/NTC
- Premiers: The Gap
- Matches: 182
- Goals: 1,048 (5.76 per match)
- Top goalscorer: Meaghan Mcelligott (50 goals)
- Biggest home win: Moreton Bay United 14-0 Mudgeeraba (15 April 2018)
- Biggest away win: Mudgeeraba 0-17 The Gap (4 February 2018); Mudgeeraba 0-17 Moreton Bay United (5 August 2018)
- Highest scoring: Mudgeeraba 0-17 The Gap (4 February 2018); Mudgeeraba 0-17 Moreton Bay United (5 August 2018)

The 2018 Women's NPL Queensland season was the fourth edition of the Women's NPL Queensland as the top level domestic football of women's competition in Queensland. 14 teams competed, all playing each other twice for a total of 26 matches.

| Pos | Team | Pld | W | D | L | GF | GA | GD | Pts | Qualification or relegation |
|---|---|---|---|---|---|---|---|---|---|---|
| 1 | The Gap | 26 | 24 | 0 | 2 | 147 | 20 | +127 | 72 | 2018 Women's NPL Qld Finals |
| 2 | Lions FC | 26 | 20 | 3 | 3 | 110 | 40 | +70 | 63 | 2018 Women's NPL Qld Finals |
| 3 | Brisbane Roar/NTC (C) | 26 | 20 | 1 | 5 | 90 | 36 | +54 | 61 | 2018 Women's NPL Qld Finals |
| 4 | Souths United | 26 | 19 | 0 | 7 | 92 | 31 | +61 | 57 | 2018 Women's NPL Qld Finals |
| 5 | Moreton Bay United | 26 | 18 | 1 | 7 | 117 | 35 | +82 | 55 | |
| 6 | Gold Coast United | 26 | 13 | 3 | 10 | 91 | 62 | +29 | 42 | |
| 7 | Mitchelton | 26 | 13 | 1 | 12 | 65 | 62 | +3 | 40 | |
| 8 | Eastern Suburbs | 26 | 11 | 4 | 11 | 54 | 71 | −17 | 37 | |
| 9 | Capalaba | 26 | 9 | 3 | 14 | 43 | 78 | −35 | 30 | |
| 10 | Logan Lightning | 26 | 7 | 3 | 16 | 63 | 87 | −24 | 24 | |
| 11 | Western Pride | 26 | 6 | 2 | 18 | 61 | 110 | −49 | 20 | |
| 12 | Sunshine Coast Wanderers | 26 | 5 | 2 | 19 | 45 | 102 | −57 | 17 | |
| 13 | South West Queensland Thunder | 26 | 3 | 0 | 23 | 36 | 145 | −109 | 9 | |
| 14 | Mudgeeraba (R) | 26 | 2 | 1 | 23 | 34 | 169 | −135 | 7 | Relegation |

Source: sportstg.com
Rules for classification: 1) points; 2) goal difference; 3) number of goals scored.
(C) Champions; (R) Relegated

==== Finals ====
Semi-finals
1 | The Gap | 2
4 | Souths United | 0
2 | Lions FC | 1
3 | Brisbane Roar/NTC | 4

Grand Final
1 | The Gap | 0
3 | Brisbane Roar/NTC | 1

== Cup competitions ==
=== 2018 Canale Cup ===
Brisbane-based soccer clubs competed in 2018 for the Canale Cup, known for sponsorship reasons as the 2018 Pig 'N' Whistle Canale Cup. Clubs entered from the Brisbane Premier League, the Capital League 1, Capital League 2 and Capital League 3. The early rounds of the competition were linked to the qualifying competition for the 2018 FFA Cup, where losing teams from successive rounds of the FFA Cup Preliminary rounds entered in following rounds of the Canale Cup.

This knockout competition was won by Grange Thistle.

=== FFA Cup qualifiers ===
Queensland-based soccer clubs competed in 2018 in the preliminary rounds for the 2018 FFA Cup. The four winners of the seventh round qualified for the final rounds of the FFA Cup; Cairns FC (representing North Queensland), Gold Coast Knights (representing South Queensland), with Olympic FC and Queensland Lions representing Brisbane. In addition, A-League club Brisbane Roar qualified for the final rounds, entering at the Round of 32.
