= Toowong FC =

- Full name: Toowong Football Club Inc.
- Founded: 1921; 105 years ago
- Ground: Dunmore Park, Auchenflower
- Capacity: 450
- Coordinates: 27°28′27″S 152°59′59″E
- President: Will Vandenberg
- Secretary: Rebecca Ashelford
- League: Brisbane Premier League
- 2022: 7th of 12
- Website: https://www.toowongfc.com.au/
Home colours	Away colours

Toowong FC is an Australian football (soccer) club based in Auchenflower, Queensland, Australia. The club was established in 1921, and currently plays in the Football Brisbane Men's Premier League (and reserves), Women's Capital League and City League competitions. The club also has junior teams for all ages with a strong focus on female participation.

== History ==
The Toowong Football Club was formed in 1921 and was accepted into Division 2 of the Queensland Football Association in its first season. The club's initial home was the Toowong Sports Ground (now known at Oakman Park) and the club remained there for its first two decades. During the 1920s Toowong SC competed in the lower divisions of Brisbane soccer except for one unsuccessful season in the top flight when the club finished last in 1922. Following the withdrawal of the Ipswich clubs at the end of the 1929 season, Toowong SC won a place in the Brisbane & District FA's Division 1, competing in six seasons from 1930 to 1935. In 1931, Toowong SC reached the Tristram Shield final but lost the decider 2–0 to Latrobe. The club reached the Division 1 Grand Final decider in 1933 which it lost 4–1, also to the Latrobe club. The club survived a relegation play-off the next season against Pineapple Rovers, but finished last in 1935 and dropped out of senior competition until 1940.

Since returning to senior competition after World War 2 the club has never reached the top flight of Brisbane football, with its highest finish being third place in Division 2 in 1954. During the 1960s Toowong SC moved to its current home, Dunmore Park in Auchenflower. In 1967 Toowong won its first honours, winning the Division 3 premiership and grand final. After winning the 1993 Division 5 Grand Final, Toowong did not field a senior men's team again until the 2007 season. In 2006 the club's name was changed to Toowong Football Club.

In 2012 Toowong FC won the Metro 2 Grand Final 5–4 against Rochedale Rovers which saw it enter the restructured Football Brisbane competition in Capital League 3 for 2013. A further Grand Final win in 2015 (1–0 over New Farm United) was not enough to achieve promotion with the club finishing third. The following season, after three consecutive third-place finishes, Toowong FC finished a close runners-up to Virginia United in the 2016 Capital League 3 competition to achieve promotion to Capital League 2 for 2017. In 2018, the creation of the Football Queensland Premier League competition resulted in a restructuring of the Brisbane competition, and Toowong FC was elevated to Football Brisbane's Capital League 1. That season the top men's team finished in 2nd place behind Caboolture, securing promotion to the men's Premier League for the first time in the Club's history.

== Recent seasons ==
Season	League											FFA Cup
Season	Division (tier)	Pld	W	D	L	GF	GA	GD	Pts	Position	Finals Series	FFA Cup
2008	Metro League 5 Silver (10)	22	9	4	9	42	41	1	31	6th ↑	DNQ	Not yet founded
2009	Metro League 4 Blue (9)	21	13	0	8	50	31	19	39	5th	DNQ	Not yet founded
2010	Metro League 4 Blue (9)	21	17	3	1	65	16	49	54	1st ↑	Semi Final	Not yet founded
2011	Metro League 3 Blue (8)	20	10	6	4	42	28	14	36	2nd ↑	Semi Final	Not yet founded
2012	Metro League 2 (7)	21	14	4	3	61	25	36	46	2nd ↑	Champions	Not yet founded
2013	Capital League 3 (6)	20	11	6	3	78	35	43	39	3rd	Semi Final	Not yet founded
2014	Capital League 3 (6)	22	13	2	7	62	31	31	41	3rd	Semi Final	Preliminary Round 1
2015	Capital League 3 (6)	22	13	5	4	48	20	28	44	3rd	Champions	Preliminary Round 2
2016	Capital League 3 (6)	22	17	2	3	63	20	43	53	2nd ↑	Runners-up	Preliminary Round 3
2017	Capital League 2 (5)	22	11	3	8	40	41	−1	36	5th	DNQ	Preliminary Round 4
2018	Capital League 1 (4)	22	16	3	3	72	25	47	36	2nd ↑	Champions	Preliminary Round 3
2019	Brisbane Premier League (3)	22	15	4	3	68	38	30	49	2nd	Runners-up	Preliminary Round 2

Key:	Premiers / Champions	Promoted ↑	Relegated ↓

The tier is the level in the Australian soccer league system

== Honours ==
Due to frequent restructures and re-classifications of divisions in Brisbane football, the club’s first team honours below are listed by tier in the Brisbane football pyramid.

Tier 3

- Brisbane Division 3 – Premiers and Champions 1967
- Brisbane Division 3 – Champions 1980

Tier 4

- Brisbane Division 4 – Premiers 1979
- Capital League 3 – Champions 2015

Tier 5

- Brisbane Division 5 – Champions 1993
- Metro League Division 2 – Champions 2012

Tier 7

- Metro League Division 4 Blue – Premiers 2010
