= Grange Thistle FC =

Grange Thistle Football Club
- Full name: Grange Thistle Football Club. Previous names: Thistle, Grange Thistle Soccer Football and Youth Club, Grange Thistle Soccer Club.
- Nickname: Thistle
- Founded: As Thistle FC, February 11, 1920. Prefix Grange added to club name in 1961.
- Ground: Lanham Park, Grange, since 1930. Previous home ground: Heath Park, East Brisbane.
- Capacity: 500
- League: Men: FQPL1 Women: FQPL1
- 2026: Men: 2nd Women: 5th
- Website: http://www.grangethistle.com/
Home colours	Away colours

Grange Thistle is an Australian soccer club based in Grange, Queensland. It was founded on 11 February 1920 at a meeting called by club pioneers Robert (Bob) Waddell, Joe Scott and Jock Cumberford.

In 2025, the club fielded 12 senior teams and more than 95 junior teams. In 2027 the senior men's team will compete in the third tier of Australian football Football Queensland Premier League 1, and the women's team in Football Queensland Premier League 1.

== Early years ==
Grange Thistle is the last of three football clubs which have carried the Thistle name since the earliest days of organised football in Brisbane. However, the club's foundation secretary, Bob Waddell, pointed out in 1924 that "the present club was formed as recently as 1920" (see accompanying article headed "A Thistle Record") and that apart from sharing a Scottish heritage it had no connection with the other two clubs (the original Thistle, formed in 1887, and Merthyr Thistle, which disbanded after the 1919 season. Nearly four decades later Bob Waddell's son, Bill, also served Thistle as club president before going on to become president of the Queensland Soccer Federation.

The first Thistle club was formed at a meeting held in the Criterion Hotel on 2 June 1887. At the time there were three Brisbane clubs believed to have Scottish connections, Queen's Park, St Andrews and Rangers, the latter club originally formed as the "Scottish Football Association" in 1883. According to Sam Ross, a member of the original Thistle club, it came into being as a breakaway group from Rangers.

This club had disappeared by the early 1900s but a Scottish-linked successor emerged by 1911 under the name Merthyr Thistle, a club based at New Farm Park. Merthyr Thistle had a brief but successful career in the junior ranks, winning the Brisbane first grade junior competition in 1915 before joining the senior competition in 1919, the first season in which competitive football resumed in Brisbane after World War I. In what turned out to be its final season, the club reached the grand final, played at the Brisbane Cricket Ground on 4 October, but fell to a 3-1 defeat against Pineapple Rovers.

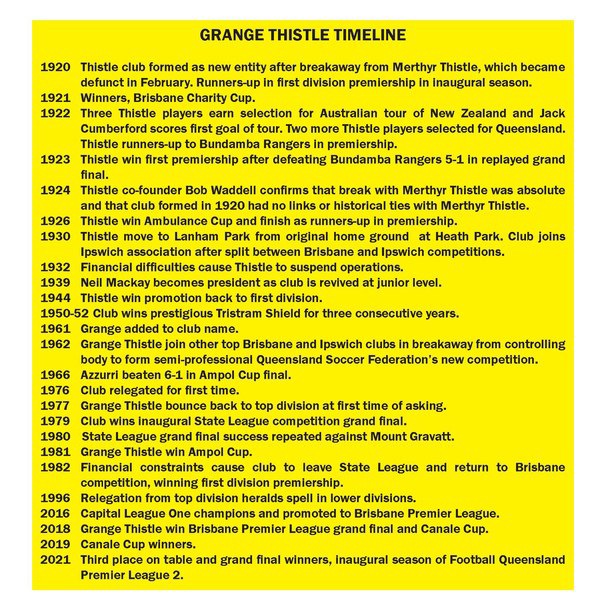
Grange Thistle historical summary

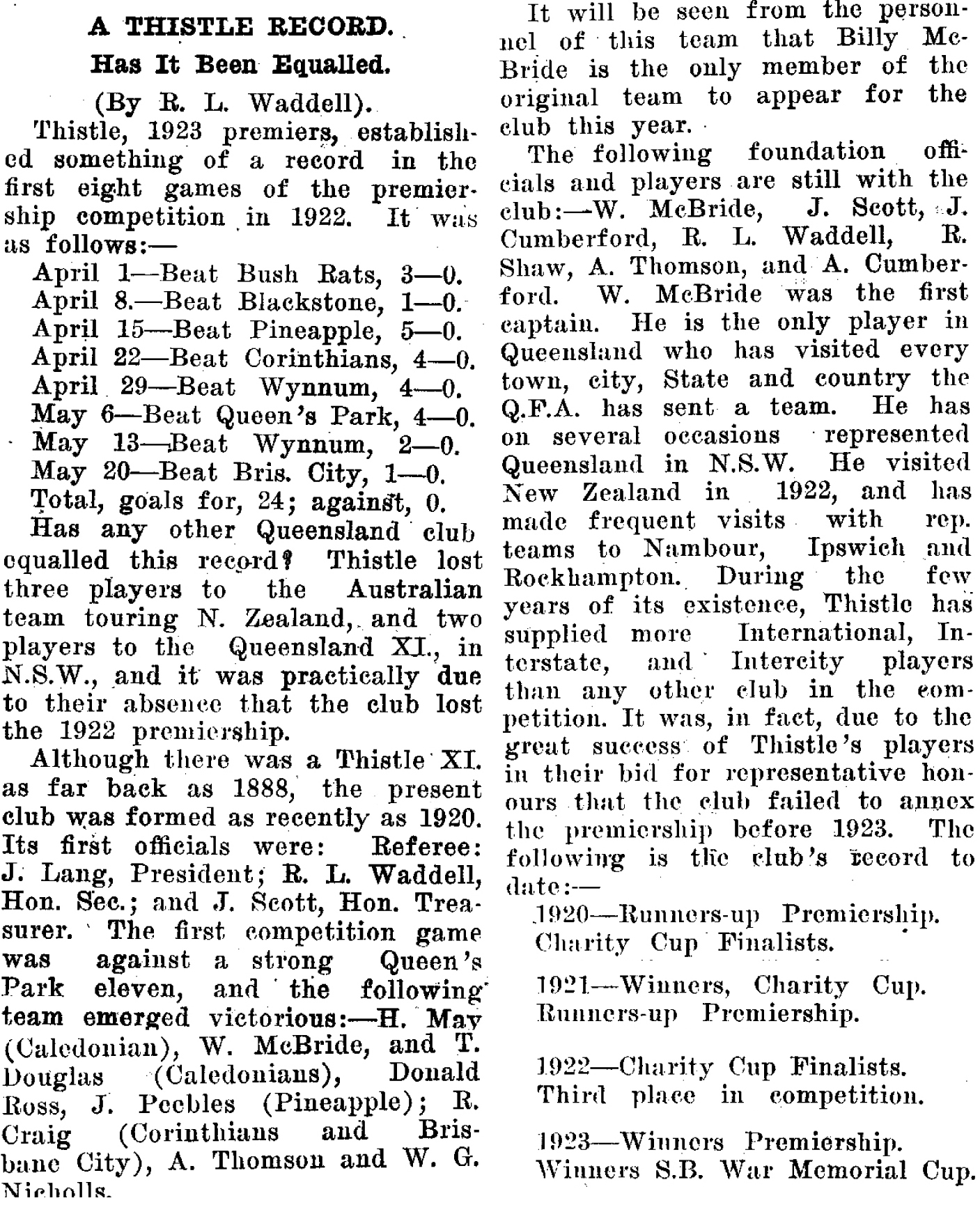
How Thistle rose to prominence after its formation in 1920 (Brisbane Soccer Record, 3 June 1924).

Two weeks later Merthyr Thistle rounded off the season on 18 October in the final game of its existence, a challenge match at Bulimba against Bush Rats, one of the leading clubs in the Ipswich competition, losing 1–0. At this stage there was no public indication of the internal dissension which was to cause the collapse of Merthyr Thistle early in 1920 and the formation of the present club. So convivial was the atmosphere that the Ipswich Times report stated that “when the players were ready to return to the city they lined up and the Pipers’ Band led the way to the ferry. The visitors were later entertained at the Alexandria Café. Mr Morgan, on behalf of the Thistles, thanked the Rats for the visit and said he hoped that they would have more such matches in the future. Mr Joe Potts responded on behalf of the Rats, and commended the Thistles on the splendid way they had treated them”.

No further references to Merthyr Thistle have been traced until 9 February 1920, when indications of a crisis emerged in the form of the advertisement in the Daily Standard mentioned above. Under the heading Merthyr Thistle Football Club, the advertisement called “all players and members” to a meeting in the Caledonian Rooms in Elizabeth Street just two days later.

The sense of urgency was apparent when this advertisement was repeated in the same newspaper the next day. No further mention of Merthyr Thistle in 1920 has been found, indicating that the club had insufficient players and officials to enter a team in either the senior or junior competitions. Under the new name Merthyrs, a club did re-emerge a year later at New Farm Park, the pre-1920 home ground of Merthyr Thistle, but only at junior third grade level (where it actually competed against one of the new Thistle club's junior teams).

On 3 March 1920, six new clubs affiliated with the Queensland British Football Association at its adjourned annual general meeting. Merthyr Thistle was not represented. However, Johnny Peebles, representing the newly formed Thistle club, was appointed as one of four club representatives on the executive committee.

Two weeks later, a press preview of the season listed nine clubs in the senior competition, including Thistle but not Merthyr Thistle. The clear inference is that the new club was formed at the meeting of Merthyr Thistle players and members called for 11 February 1920.

On 20 March 1920, Thistle played its first match, a friendly against Brisbane City. In a 5-2 victory at Heath Park, W Nicholls had the honour of scoring the club's first goal, with Jock Cumberford and Bob Craig each netting a brace.

A few days later, the Queensland British Football Association placed its 30 registered junior clubs into three grades for the forthcoming season. Thistle's second-string team was placed in the second grade but Merthyr Thistle had become defunct and did not enter any teams in either the senior or junior grades.

On 27 March Thistle played a second friendly, against Queen's Park, also at Heath Park, where the new club had established its headquarters. The match was drawn 2–2.

On the official opening day of the 1920 season, 10 April, Thistle played the club's first competitive match, defeating Queen's Park 3–1 at the Brisbane Cricket Ground, with the following lineup: Harry May, Billy McBride (captain), G Mackay, Donald Ross, Johnny Peebles, J Lambert, Jock Cumberford, Alec McMillan, Bob Craig, Alex Thompson and W Nicholls. Centre-forward Craig scored a hat-trick. The highly successful first season ended with 10 wins, two draws and three defeats to place Thistle in second position behind Corinthians on the premiership table. Thistle's tenure at Heath Park was confirmed the following season when an application for use of the ground was approved by the Brisbane City Council, at an annual rent of one guinea.

By 1922 Thistle had amassed one of the most powerful teams in the country and were locked in a neck-and-neck premiership battle with Bundamba Rangers, both teams having won their first seven matches. However, Thistle eventually finished as runners-up to their Ipswich rivals, having paid a heavy price in mid-season while five players were away on representative duty (Jock Cumberford, Dave Cumberford and Billy McBride with Australia in New Zealand, along with Johnny Peebles and Jimmy Love on tour to New South Wales with Queensland).

But Thistle made no mistake just one season later, annexing their first major honour by claiming the 1923 Brisbane premiership with a 5–1 win in the Challenge Cup replay against Bundamba Rangers. Dinmore Bush Rats actually finished first on the points table, with Thistle second and Bundamba third, but under the short-lived Challenge Cup system featuring the top four teams in a knockout series, Thistle came out on top as the officially designated premiers.

In those first few seasons, Thistle's remarkable performances for a fledgling club marked it as one of Australia's most powerful squads. By the early 1930s, nine Thistle players had represented Australia, including the Cumberford brothers, Jock (also known as Jack) and Dave. Jock Cumberford, who coached the Queensland team after World War II, earned a unique honour when he was awarded a special medal for scoring Australia's first international goal in a 3–1 win against Wanganui in the opening game of the tour of New Zealand in 1922. Other Thistle players who earned selection for Australia during that period were Jimmy Love, Billy McBride, Angus Marshall, Andrew Park, John Peebles, Jimmy Robertson and John Steel. Peebles and Steel were both destined to make a long-term mark on Queensland football as senior administrators.

Press reports during the 1920s also provided confirmation that the Thistle club was not linked in any way with the now defunct Merthyr Thistle. A press profile of Thistle's international forward Jock Cumberford stated that he had played for Merthyr Thistle in 1919 but “the following season saw the club disband, and the present Thistle club formed”.

Two years later co-founder Bob Waddell confirmed in an article outlining Thistle's achievements that the club was founded in 1920, not 1919, and listed its complete playing record, season by season. He also recalled that the first competitive match played by Thistle was against Queen's Park in 1920.

The following year, conclusive evidence was provided that no link existed between Merthyr Thistle and the club formed in 1920. Under the heading “The Story of the Thistle Club”, Bob Waddell stated: “In the 1919 season a club by the name of Merthyr Thistle was formed, but owing to great dissension among the officials and players, the club only reigned one season, and the players, with one exception, decided to break away the following year. A meeting was convened by J Cumberford, J Scott and R L Waddell, and it was decided unanimously that we form a Thistle club — an entirely new club having no connection whatever with the club known as Merthyr Thistle. J Lang (now a referee) was elected chairman, R L Waddell honorary secretary and J Scott honorary treasurer. The first season saw the club just failing to annex the honours both in the premiership and Charity Cup competitions.”

== 1930s ==
By the late 1920s, Thistle's strength had waned and after finishing bottom of the first division premiership in 1929 the club was facing relegation. However, the following season saw one of the code's periodic upheavals in Queensland when Brisbane's leading clubs, with the sole exception of Thistle, decided to break away from the state governing body and form a company to run their affairs. Thistle declined to join the breakaway and at a special meeting held on 11 February 1930, it was decided to join the Ipswich and West Moreton Association instead.

At the start of the 1930 season Thistle moved to its current home Lanham Park which was described in April 1930 as "an open paddock".

By the end of the 1931 season, however, the club was struggling on and off the field, having finished last in the 10-team Ipswich competition and facing severe challenges during a period of world-wide recession. In March, 1932 the Sports Referee reported that although members at the Thistle annual general meeting were determined to continue, the club was in deep financial difficulty, with a credit balance of £1/5 and liabilities of £4/10. Poor attendances at Lanham Park meant that only £8/16/4 had been collected during the entire preceding season and travel expenses for regular trips to Ipswich had also depleted the club's resources. It was decided to suspend operations because of the club's financial difficulties. President H M Herald indicated that the club intended to re-form if the dispute between the Ipswich and Brisbane organizations ended. However, this rift was not healed until several years later, by which time the Thistle club had effectively ceased to function.

== War Years ==
No written record has been found to explain how or when the re-formed Thistle club re-emerged at Lanham Park. It is known that two Scots, Neil Mackay and former Thistle and Queensland goalkeeper Jimmy Perotte, as well as former Thistle captain and Australian international Jim Martin were instrumental in forming a Thistle junior team at Lanham Park between 1939 and 1942 (the latter year being listed as the club's foundation year in Queensland Soccer Football Association yearbooks from 1946 to 1961).

The fact that in 1932 the club clearly indicated an intention to re-form if circumstances changed, and that the name Thistle was retained, points strongly to its revival being regarded as a continuation of the club formed in 1920. One certainty, however, is that the club badge current in 2025, which displays 1919 as the foundation year, is inaccurate. This error apparently crept in at the time the Queensland Soccer Federation was formed in 1962, when this date first appeared in its yearbook. Every pre-1962 reference that has been found relating to the club's history lists the foundation year as 1920 or 1942.

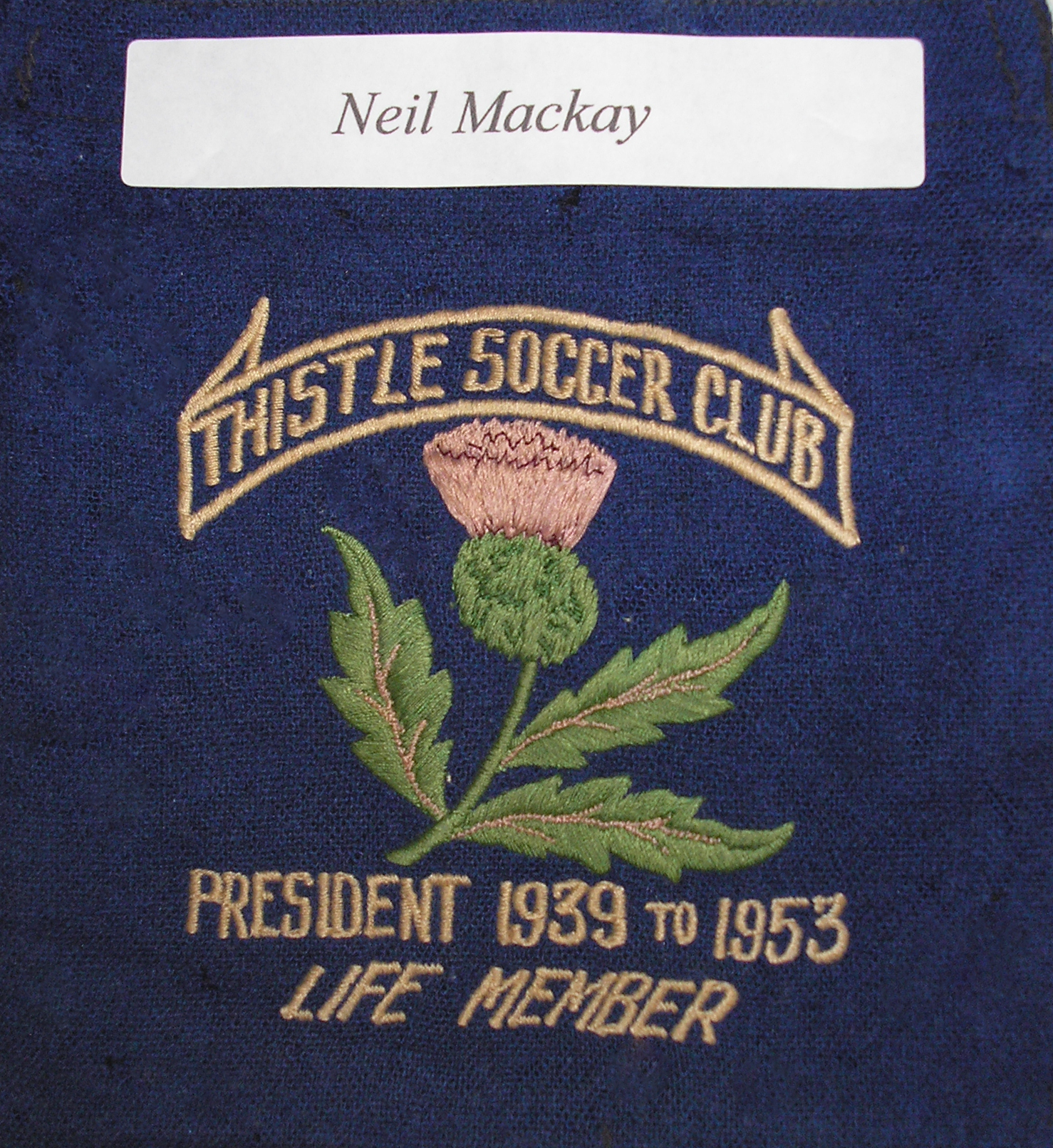
Long-serving Thistle president Neil Mackay's club blazer badge

There is one piece of evidence indicating that the club was definitely active again as early as the late 1930s. The Mackay family still has a blazer badge containing the inscription "Neil Mackay – Thistle president, 1939–1953)". The Queensland Soccer News reported on 21 May 1947 that Mackay had "re-formed the club with 11 juniors who had never played soccer before".

No formal fixtures could be played in the early 1940s because these had been suspended during World War Two. However, when competitions resumed in 1944, Thistle were able to field a team strong enough to win the junior division and earn promotion to the first division for the 1945 season.

== Post-World War 2 ==
For the next 32 seasons, from 1945 to 1976, Thistle retained top division status in Brisbane without being able to add to their premiership honours. However, the club did have several major cup successes, including three consecutive Tristram Shield wins from 1950 to 1952 and a 6–1 thrashing of Azzurri (later Brisbane City) in the 1966 Ampol Cup final.

At the start of the 1961 season The Courier-Mail reported that Thistle had decided to enhance its local identity by adding Grange as a prefix to its name and (to avoid frequent clashes with other teams wearing colours similar to Thistle's traditional blue) would switch to tangerine and white as its primary colours. There was no change to playing personnel, home ground, club officials or top division status, except that long-serving Thistle stalwart Bob Jardine was elected as incoming president for the season ahead. There was no suggestion that a new club was being formed. For the second time in the club's history it was facing relegation after finishing bottom of the table in that season, but once again a split in Queensland football came to the rescue. Formation of the breakaway Queensland Soccer Federation at the start of the 1962 season enabled Thistle to join other leading Brisbane and Ipswich clubs in an eight-team semi-professional competition in which a respectable mid-table position was secured. This was largely due to the influence of diminutive Scottish captain-coach Norm Tran, whose acquisition from East Fife provided the impetus for a club revival. Tran represented Queensland several times that season before departing to join Sydney first division club Auburn.

But by 1976 club fortunes had again declined and Grange Thistle were relegated to the second division for the first time. Once again, a Scotsman was instrumental in enabling the club to bounce back immediately by winning promotion. This time the catalyst was the signing of Jim Hermiston, a member of the Aberdeen team which beat Celtic 3–1 to win the Scottish Cup in 1970. Although Hermiston left after one season to play in the National Soccer League, Thistle enjoyed a period of great success in the short-lived Queensland State League (1979 to 1982), winning consecutive grand finals against Mount Gravatt in 1979 and 1980. During this period the club qualified for the national cup competition twice, losing each time to Brisbane Lions in the 1980 and 1981 NSL Cup competitions. The club also had cup success on the local scene, claiming the Ampol Cup for a second time in 1981.

Amid financial problems, the club controversially left the short-lived State League in 1982 and dropped back to Brisbane competition, winning its first Brisbane Division One premiership since 1923. There was, however, a big difference in the status of the two triumphs. In 1923 the local first division was an elite tier one competition but the 1982 version was ranked third in Queensland behind the National Soccer League and State League.

Grange Thistle competed in the Brisbane Premier League for all but three seasons from the commencement of this league in 1983 until 1996 when relegation heralded a period of decline in its playing fortunes. Since then it has played in the second and third tiers of the Brisbane competition until achieving promotion back to the Premier League by finishing in second place in Capital League 1 in 2016.

== 21st century ==
In 2018, Grange Thistle were crowned champions of the Brisbane Premier League after finishing second in the league and going on to win the finals series. They also won the Canale Cup for the first time since 1981, when it was known as the Ampol Cup, and retained this trophy in 2019.

From 2020 onward, Grange Thistle FC continued to strengthen its position within Queensland’s football structure. In 2020, the club competed in the Brisbane Premier League, finishing fourth in a solid campaign. The following year brought a major structural shift across Queensland football, with Grange Thistle moving into the newly formed Football Queensland Premier League 2 (FQPL2). Their debut season in the division in 2021 was strong, the club defeated Caboolture 3-1 in the grand final of the inaugural season of Football Queensland's Premier League 2 competition, having finished third on the premiership table.

Performances dipped slightly in 2022 as the team finished seventh, but they rebounded well in 2023 with a return to third place. In 2024, the men’s squad again delivered a competitive season, ending fourth with a positive win–loss record. The 2025 FQPL2 season proved more challenging, with the team recording a high number of draws and inconsistent form. In 2026 Thistle gained automatic promotion by finishing second on the table, a achievement capped by defeating Pine Hills in the grand final.

Grange Thistle’s women’s program has also progressed significantly during recent seasons. In 2020 and 2021, the women’s first team competed in the Brisbane Women’s Premier League, finishing ninth and seventh respectively. With Football Queensland’s restructuring, the club competed in FQPL2 Women from 2022, finishing seventh before climbing to fourth in 2023. Their strongest modern season arrived in 2024, where the women’s team topped the league, recording 13 wins, four draws, and only one loss. Despite finishing as premiers, they were narrowly defeated by Caboolture Sports in the Grand Final. In 2025, the team competed in FQPL1 Women, finishing sixth as they continued to build depth across the senior and youth female pathways.

Off the field, Grange Thistle made several major strides between 2020 and 2026. In 2025, the club submitted a notable development application for upgrades to the Lanham Park precinct, including new futsal courts with lighting, an extended timber deck, improved pathways, landscaping, and enhanced viewing areas. These upgrades reflect the club’s long-term vision and growing community footprint. The club’s youth development also advanced impressively, achieving Football Queensland Academy Silver status, a recognition of strong coaching standards and player pathways across junior boys and girls programs. Throughout this period, Grange Thistle maintained a thriving community football environment, supporting men’s and women’s social teams, including Over 35s, Over 45s, and Women’s Over 30s, and continuing to encourage new players ahead of each upcoming season.

== Recent seasons ==
Men's senior team:

Season	League											FFA Cup Australia Cup	Canale Cup
Season	Division (tier)	Pld	W	D	L	GF	GA	GD	Pts	Position	Finals Series	FFA Cup Australia Cup	Canale Cup
2008	Premier Division 1 (4)	22	5	5	12	20	38	−18	20	9th	DNQ	Not yet founded	N.A.
2009	Premier Division 1 (4)	22	2	3	17	20	59	−39	9	11th	DNQ	Not yet founded	N.A.
2010	Premier Division 1 (4)	26	1	3	22	29	80	−51	6	14th ↓	DNQ	Not yet founded	N.A.
2011	Premier Division 2 (5)	26	11	5	10	43	42	1	38	7th	DNQ	Not yet founded	N.A.
2012	Premier Division 2 (5)	22	7	2	13	36	47	−11	23	9th	DNQ	Not yet founded	N.A.
2013	Capital League 2 (5)	22	16	2	4	69	37	32	50	2nd ↑	Semi-finalist	Not yet founded	N.A.
2014	Capital League 1 (4)	22	6	5	11	27	49	−22	23	9th	DNQ	Preliminary Round 1	N.A.
2015	Capital League 1 (4)	21	6	4	11	26	43	−17	22	9th	DNQ	Preliminary Round 3	N.A.
2016	Capital League 1 (4)	22	15	1	6	53	30	23	46	2nd ↑	Champions	Preliminary Round 4	N.A.
2017	Brisbane Premier League (3)	22	6	4	12	37	57	−20	22	10th	DNQ	Preliminary Round 7	Round 5
2018	Brisbane Premier League (3)	22	12	5	5	46	21	25	41	2nd	Champions	Preliminary Round 3	Champions
2019	Brisbane Premier League (3)	22	13	5	4	55	33	22	44	5th	DNQ	Preliminary Round 5	Champions
2020	Brisbane Premier League (3)	16	9	2	5	40	24	16	29	4th	NA	Preliminary Round 3 (COVID)	N.A.
2021	Football Queensland Premier League 2 (3)	21	11	6	4	43	25	18	39	3rd	Champions	Preliminary Round 3	N.A.
2022	Football Queensland Premier League 2 (3)	22	8	3	11	37	41	-4	27	7th	DNQ	Preliminary Round 4	N.A.
2023	Football Queensland Premier League 2 (3)	22	12	6	4	52	38	14	42	4th	Semi- Finals	Preliminary Round 3	N.A.
2024	Football Queensland Premier League 2 (3)	22	11	7	4	60	40	20	40	4th	Semi- Finals	Preliminary Round 3	N.A.
2025	Football Queensland Premier League 2 (3)	22	9	5	8	50	45	5	32	4th	Semi- Finals	Preliminary Round 3	N.A.

Women's senior team:

Season	League											Kappa Women's Super Cup	Elaine Watson Cup
Season	Division (tier)	Pld	W	D	L	GF	GA	GD	Pts	Position	Finals Series	Kappa Women's Super Cup	Elaine Watson Cup
2018	Women's Capital League 1 (4)	18	7	3	8	37	43	−6	24	6th	DNQ	Not yet founded	Round of 16
2019	Women's Capital League 1 (4)	18	13	2	3	46	19	27	41	2nd ↑	Runners-up	Not yet founded	Round of 16
2020	Brisbane Women's Premier League (3)	14	5	0	9	15	41	-26	15	9th	DNQ	Not yet founded	N.A
2021	Brisbane Women's Premier League (3)	21	6	1	14	32	48	-16	19	7th	DNQ	Round 2	Quarter Finals
2022	Football Queensland Premier League 2(3)	22	7	4	11	26	33	-7	25	7th	DNQ	Round 2	N.A.
2023	Football Queensland Premier League 2(3)	18	8	6	4	26	22	4	30	4th	Semi Finals	Round 5	N.A.
2024	Football Queensland Premier League 2(3)	18	13	4	1	37	10	27	43	1st ↑	Runners-up	Semi Finals	N.A.
2025	Football Queensland Premier League 1(2)	18	7	2	9	24	34	-10	23	6th	DNQ	Quarter Finals	N.A.

Key:	Premiers / Champions	Promoted ↑	Relegated ↓

The tier is the level in the unofficial Australian soccer league system

== Honours ==
Due to frequent restructures and re-classifications of divisions in Brisbane football, the club's first team honours below are listed by tier in the unofficial Brisbane football pyramid.

Women

Brisbane – Tier 2

- South East Queensland FQPL 2 – Premiers 2024

Men

State Tier

- Queensland State League – Premiers 1979
- Queensland State League – Champions 1979, 1980

Brisbane – Tier 1

- Brisbane Division 1 – Premiers 1923 (runners-up on Premiership points and winners of top-four Challenge Cup), 1982; Champions 1982
- Tristram Shield – Winners 1950, 1951, 1952
- Ampol Cup – Winners 1966, 1981
- Pig N Whistle Canale Cup – Winners 2018, 2019

Brisbane – Tier 2

- Brisbane Division 2 – Champions 1977
- Capital League 1 – Champions 2016
- Brisbane BPL – Champions 2018
- South East Queensland FQPL 2 – Champions 2021

Brisbane – Tier 3

- Brisbane Premier Division 2 – Premiers 2007
