= Underwood Park =

Underwood Park may refer to:

- Underwood Park (Paisley), a former association football ground in Scotland, used by Abercorn FC and the Scotland national team
- Underwood Park, Rochedale, a sports ground in Rochedale, Queensland, Australia
