= Canale Cup =

Football competition in Australia

- Founded: 1894
- State: Queensland
- Number of clubs: 47 (in 2018)
- Level on pyramid: 3–7
- Current champions: 2019 Grange Thistle (7th title)
- Most championships: Dinmore Bush Rats (10 titles)

The Canale Cup is a football (soccer) knockout cup competition for the Brisbane, Australia region that includes teams from the Brisbane Premier League and all Capital Leagues (1–3). From 2017 to 2020 it was known as the Pig 'N' Whistle Canale Cup for sponsorship reasons.

This has been the major knockout cup competition for the Brisbane region since 2002, when it was known as the South-East Queensland Cup, and subsequently the Premier Cup, and since 2010 with the current naming rights sponsor. Before this and on a statewide basis, several knockout competitions have been held since 1894 in various forms, with the major Queensland knockout cup competitions initially called the Charity Cup to 1920, from 1921 to 1958 as the Tristram Shield, between 1959 and 1991 as the Ampol Cup, and between 1992 and 2001 as the Queensland Cup.

From 2014 to 2018, this knockout competition was also linked with various preliminary rounds of the FFA Cup.

== Current cup competitions 2019-onwards ==
The format was changed for 2019, with 35 Capital League clubs entering in the first round, with the 20 winners (15 ties and 5 byes) joining the 12 Brisbane Men's Premier League clubs in the second round (as the Round of 32).

Competition and year	Winner
Pig 'N' Whistle Canale Cup 2019	Grange Thistle
Canale Cup 2020	Cancelled due to the impacts of the COVID-19 pandemic in Australia
Canale Cup 2021	Albany Creek Excelsior

== Former cup competition format (linked to FFA cup qualifiers) 2014–2018 ==
The format for 2014 and 2015 was also a qualifying competition for the FFA Cup, where both the Canale Cup finalists qualified for the FFA Cup Round of 32.

In 2016, the 10 Brisbane-based winners from Round 4 qualified to a separate Canale Cup competition, no longer linked to the FFA Cup qualification process. Apart from the NPL sides, none of the Brisbane-based teams survived beyond Round 7 of that preliminary competition.

For 2017 and 2018, the competition was further restructured, with losing teams from successive rounds of the FFA Cup Preliminary Rounds entering in following rounds of the Canale Cup.

Competition and year	Winner	FFA Cup qualification	Brisbane qualifiers
Canale Travel Cup 2014	Brisbane Strikers	2014 FFA Cup preliminary rounds	Brisbane Strikers; Olympic FC
Canale Travel Cup 2015	Queensland Lions	2015 FFA Cup preliminary rounds	Brisbane Strikers; Queensland Lions
Canale Travel Cup 2016	Mitchelton FC	2016 FFA Cup preliminary rounds	none
Pig 'N' Whistle Canale Cup 2017	Peninsula Power	2017 FFA Cup preliminary rounds	Peninsula Power
Pig 'N' Whistle Canale Cup 2018	Grange Thistle	2018 FFA Cup preliminary rounds	none

== Previous cup competitions 2002–2013 (Brisbane-based) ==
Competition and year	Winner
South East Queensland Cup 2002	Queensland Lions
South East Queensland Cup 2003	Queensland Lions
Premier Cup 2004	Brisbane City
Premier Cup 2005	Palm Beach
Premier Cup 2006	Brisbane Strikers
Premier Cup 2007	Pine Rivers United

Competition and year	Winner
Premier Cup 2008	Peninsula Power
Premier Cup 2009	Brisbane City
Canale Cup 2010	Capalaba Bulldogs
Canale Cup 2011	Rochedale Rovers
Canale Cup 2012	Queensland Lions
Canale Cup 2013	Peninsula Power

== Queensland Cup 1992–2001 ==
Competition and year	Winner
Queensland Cup 1992	Rochedale Rovers
Queensland Cup 1993	North Brisbane
Queensland Cup 1994	Rochedale Rovers
Queensland Cup 1995	Taringa Rovers
Queensland Cup 1996	Brisbane City

Competition and year	Winner
Queensland Cup 1997	Wynnum District
Queensland Cup 1998	Brisbane City
Queensland Cup 1999	Gold Coast City
2000	no competition
Queensland Cup 2001	Brisbane City

== Ampol Cup 1959–1991 ==
Competition and year	Winner
Ampol Cup 1959	Oxley United
Ampol Cup 1960	Hellenic
Ampol Cup 1961	Hellenic
Ampol Cup 1962	Hellenic
Ampol Cup 1963	Hellenic
Ampol Cup 1964	Hellenic
Ampol Cup 1965	Coalstars
Ampol Cup 1966	Grange Thistle
Ampol Cup 1967	St. Helens United
Ampol Cup 1968	Hollandia-Inala
Ampol Cup 1969	Azzurri
Ampol Cup 1970	Hollandia-Inala
Ampol Cup 1971	Azzurri
Ampol Cup 1972	Merton-East
Ampol Cup 1973	Brisbane Lions
Ampol Cup 1974	Brisbane City
Ampol Cup 1975	St George-Souths

Competition and year	Winner
Ampol Cup 1976	Brisbane City
Ampol Cup 1977	Spencer Park United
Ampol Cup 1978	Southside Eagles
Ampol Cup 1979	Ipswich United
Ampol Cup 1980	Townsville United
Ampol Cup 1981	Grange Thistle
Ampol Cup 1982	Townsville United
Ampol Cup 1983	Ipswich United
Ampol Cup 1984	North Star
Ampol Cup 1985	North Star
Ampol Cup 1986	Coalstars
Ampol Cup 1987	Coalstars
Ampol Cup 1988	Gold Coast
Ampol Cup 1989	North Star
Ampol Cup 1990	North Star
Ampol Cup 1991	Mount Gravatt

== Tristram Shield 1921–1961 ==
Competition and year	Winner
Tristram Shield 1921	Corinthians
Tristram Shield 1922	Dinmore Bush Rats
Tristram Shield 1923	Bundamba Rangers
Tristram Shield 1924	Dinmore Bush Rats
Tristram Shield 1925	Latrobe
Tristram Shield 1926	Blackstone Rovers
Tristram Shield 1927	Latrobe
Tristram Shield 1928	Dinmore Bush Rats
Tristram Shield 1929	Latrobe
Tristram Shield 1930	Latrobe
Tristram Shield 1931	Latrobe
Tristram Shield 1932	Latrobe
Tristram Shield 1933	Dinmore Wanderers
Tristram Shield 1934	Latrobe
Tristram Shield 1935	Booval Stars
Tristram Shield 1936	Milton
1937	No competition
Tristram Shield 1938	Booval Stars
Tristram Shield 1939	Bundamba Rangers

Competition and year	Winner
Tristram Shield 1940	YMCA
Tristram Shield 1941	St. Helens
1942–1943	No competition due to World War II
Tristram Shield 1944	Blackstone Rovers
Tristram Shield 1945	Eastern Suburbs
Tristram Shield 1946	Bundamba Rangers
Tristram Shield 1947	St. Helens
Tristram Shield 1948	St. Helens
Tristram Shield 1949	Bundamba Rangers
Tristram Shield 1950	Grange Thistle
Tristram Shield 1951	Grange Thistle
Tristram Shield 1952	Grange Thistle
Tristram Shield 1953	Blackstone Rovers
Tristram Shield 1954	Bundamba Rangers
Tristram Shield 1955	Dinmore Bush Rats
Tristram Shield 1956	Eastern Suburbs
Tristram Shield 1957	Bundamba Rangers
Tristram Shield 1958	Oxley United
Tristram Shield 1959	Annerley FC
Tristram Shield 1960	Azzurri
Tristram Shield 1961	Hellenic

== Charity Cup 1894–1920 ==
Competition and year	Winner
Charity Cup 1894	Rosebanks
Charity Cup 1895	Normans
Charity Cup 1896	Ipswich Rovers
Charity Cup 1897	Rosebanks
Charity Cup 1898	Dinmore Bush Rats
Charity Cup 1899	Dinmore Bush Rats
1900	No competition
Challenge Cup 1901	Dinmore Bush Rats (Note: The Challenge Cup – normally a league format – was held as a knockout competition instead.)
Challenge Cup 1902	Bundamba Rangers
Charity Cup 1903	Dinmore Bush Rats
Charity Cup 1904	Blackstone Rovers B
Charity Cup 1905	Wellington

Competition and year	Winner
Charity Cup 1906	Wellington
1907–1908	No competition
Charity Cup 1909	Dinmore Bush Rats
Charity Cup 1910	Dinmore Bush Rats
Charity Cup 1911	Bulimba Rangers
Charity Cup 1912	Bulimba Rangers
Charity Cup 1913	Toowong Stars
Charity Cup 1914	Corinthians
Charity Cup 1915	Brisbane City
1916–1918	No competition due to World War I
Charity Cup 1919	Bulimba Rangers
Charity Cup 1920	Pineapple Rovers

== See also ==
- History of association football in Brisbane, Queensland
- Honours list for Brisbane Premier League (and predecessor competitions)
- FFA Cup
