= Southside Eagles FC =

- Full name: Southside Eagles Football Club
- Founded: 1968
- Ground: Memorial Park, Bulimba
- League: Queensland Premier League 2
- 2026: 11th of 12
- Website: http://www.southsideeagles.com/

Southside Eagles FC is an Australian football (soccer) club from Bulimba, a suburb of Brisbane. The club was founded when the Germania and Southside Belmont clubs merged in 1968 and it currently competes in Football Queensland Premier League.

== History ==
The Germania soccer club was formed by Rudi Gerhard and Guenther Pieplow and was originally supported by members of Brisbane German community. The club won Brisbane's Division Two at their first attempt in 1962, but were relegated from Division One after a single season. The club returned to Division Two and remained there until clinching promotion again in 1968, but were once again relegated after a single season in the top tier.

The Southside Belmont Soccer Club was originally a junior club. It competed in Division Two at a senior level for two seasons (1964 and 1965), then spent three seasons in Division Three before being absorbed by Germania after the 1968 season.

Germania changed its name to Southside Eagles FC after the 1972 season, as part of a drive from the Queensland Soccer Federation to remove ethnic names from clubs.

Southside Eagles won promotion to Division One after claiming the Division Two championship in 1974, and remained in the top division of Queensland soccer for the next six seasons. This including the 1978 season which was the most successful in the club's history, winning a 'Grand Slam' of trophies: the President’s Cup, the Ampol Cup, the Premiership and the Grand Final. Southside Eagles qualified for the NSL Cup twice during this period, knocked out in the first round by Sydney's Eastern Suburbs in 1978 and Brisbane Lions in 1979, each time losing narrowly by a single goal.

Encouraged by its 1978 success when it was effectively the third strongest Queensland club behind the state's two NSL representatives, Southside Eagles joined the short-lived Queensland State League in 1979, but withdrew after two seasons due to financial losses. Many players left Southside Eagles to join clubs that remained in the State League, and this initiated a long period of decline for the club.

The club fell as low as Division Five which they won in their single season there in 1993, and then slowly climbed back up the divisions.

After winning the Premier Division Two league and grand final in 2010, Southside Eagles were promoted to the second tier of Football Brisbane competition where they have remained in since, and which has been known as Capital League 1 since the 2013 Football Brisbane restructure.

In May 2017, Football Queensland announced Southside Eagles were among the 14 clubs accepted to form the Football Queensland Premier League for its initial season in 2018.

== Recent Seasons ==
Season	League											FFA Cup
Season	Division (tier)	Pld	W	D	L	GF	GA	GD	Pts	Position	Finals Series	FFA Cup
2008	Premier Division 2 (5)	22	11	3	8	51	37	14	36	5th	DNQ	Not yet founded
2009	Premier Division 2 (5)	22	10	5	7	43	28	15	35	4th	Semi-finalist	Not yet founded
2010	Premier Division 2 (5)	22	14	4	4	60	23	37	46	1st ↑	Champions	Not yet founded
2011	Premier Division 1 (4)	26	8	6	12	39	43	−4	30	12th	DNQ	Not yet founded
2012	Premier Division 1 (4)	26	10	1	15	55	69	−14	31	10th	DNQ	Not yet founded
2013	Capital League 1 (4)	22	11	7	4	51	23	28	40	4th	Semi-finalist	Not yet founded
2014	Capital League 1 (4)	22	6	6	10	28	41	−13	24	7th	DNQ	Preliminary Round 2
2015	Capital League 1 (4)	22	6	7	8	27	30	−3	25	8th	DNQ	Preliminary Round 4
2016	Capital League 1 (4)	22	13	3	6	38	25	13	42	4th	Runners-up	Preliminary Round 6
2017	Capital League 1 (4)	22	9	6	7	51	33	18	33	7th	DNQ	Preliminary Round 5
2018	2018 Football Queensland Premier League (2)	26	7	3	14	36	59	−23	24	11TH	DNQ	Preliminary Round 5
2019	2019 Football Queensland Premier League {2}	18	3	3	12	22	46	−24	12	9TH	DNQ	Preliminary Round 5

Key:	Premiers / Champions	Promoted ↑	Relegated ↓

The tier is the level in the Australian soccer league system

== Honours ==
- Brisbane Division 2 – Premiers 1962 and 1968 (Germania)
- Brisbane Division 2 – Premiers and Champions 1974
- Brisbane Division 1 – Premiers and Champions 1978
- Ampol Cup – Winners 1978
- Brisbane Division 4 – Champions 1990
- Brisbane Division 5 – Premiers 1995
- Premier Division 2 – Premiers 2003
- Premier Division 2 – Premiers and Champions 2010

== Coaches ==
- 2002–2004 Alan Moreland
- 2005–2009 Dale Zimmerlie
- 2010–2014 Gary Henshaw
- 2015–2018 Roger Hunter
- 2019–2020 Jarrod Lane
- 2021–present Claude Capelli

== Assistant coaches ==
2008-2010 Michael Burke
