= North Brisbane FC =

- Full name: North Brisbane Football Club
- Founded: 1957
- Ground: Prentice Park, Lutwyche
- League: FQPL 3 – Metro
- 2025: 11th of 13
- Website: http://websites.sportstg.com/club_info.cgi?c=1-9386-162699-326934-0&sID=371248

North Brisbane FC is an Australian football (soccer) club from Lutwyche, an inner northern suburb of Brisbane. The club was formed in 1957 as the Polonia Soccer Club. The club was reborn under club president Kerry Harmon, Treasurer Greg Vitulano and secretary Paul Brown in 2015 and it competes in Capital League 2, rejoining the Football Brisbane league structure in 2015. In recent years, the club has formed alliances with both Newfarm Punjabi Sports Club and the Queensland University of Technology Football Club."NBFC" as it is known will undergo a ground refit in late 2019 consisting of a new playing surface, fencing and extra change room for players. The club has a strong female contingent. 45% of its registered players are female and had a team in the Women's Brisbane Premier League for 2019. Men's Capital League 4 was dissolved and the club competed in League 3 in 2017 and was promoted. In 2018 the club expanded its Men's City League teams to 3 and had some lower grade success with the City League 7 team performing well and reaching the grand final under super coach Carlo Borzellega and "man manager" Chris Tully's guidance in 2018 and 2019. The Women's City League 4 side also had success reaching the 2019 grand final.

The club has had recent success in 2021 with the Men's program winning the Capital League 2 championship and grand final, along with a strong reserves team whom also did the league and cup double, were promoted. The Men's team won back-to-back promotion with their 2022 season. The club's current Men's team plays in the Football Queensland Premier League 3 – Metro. The women's program claimed the FQPL 3 league title with a successful season in 2022 and were runners up in the grand final of 2022.

In 2022, the O35s had significant success winning the league and taking out the grand final, whilst setting a club record winning 19 games in a row, whilst only conceding 6 goals.

== History ==
The Polonia Soccer Club was formed in 1957 by Brisbane's Polish community who were the club's main supporters in its formative years. The club commenced in the lower divisions and had reached Brisbane's Second Division by 1962. Polonia missed out on promotion to Division One in 1966, finishing second to Hollandia Inala and losing the Grand Final 3–1 to the same team. Polonia were Division Two runners-up again in 1967, but were promoted to the top flight when Brisbane Division One was expanded from 8 to 10 clubs for the next season.

Polonia remained in Division One for 13 seasons from 1968 to 1980, changing its name to the North Brisbane Soccer Club after the 1972 season, to conform with the new policy of the Queensland Soccer Federation to remove ethnic names from clubs. During this period in the top tier of Brisbane football, the club usually finishing mid-table and reaching the final series just once in 1975 when it achieved fourth place, its highest ever ranking in Brisbane football.

After 1980, North Brisbane went into a period of decline, being relegated three times in six seasons to reach Division Three (then Tier 5 of the Brisbane competition, and Tier 6 nationally) in 1986, the lowest division the club has ever competed at. The club's fortunes rapidly turned around with promotions being won in 1986, 1987, 1990 and 1991. These four promotions returning the club to Brisbane's top flight again, by now known as the Brisbane Premier League. The club was known as the Lutwyche United Soccer Club from 1987 to 1992 which coincided with the club's rapid ascent up the divisions, reverting to North Brisbane SC from the 1993 season onwards. During this period, North Brisbane completed four seasons in the BPL from 1992 to 1995, and had its best result in cup competition, winning the Queensland State Cup in 1993.

After the 1995 BPL season in which North Brisbane came 11th, the club withdrew from the Brisbane Men's Football competition. North Brisbane then competed in various local amateur leagues, including the Queensland Independent Football League (formerly the Commercial League) and Queensland Christian Soccer Association for the next two decades.

The club returned as North Brisbane FC to Football Brisbane competition in 2015, joining Capital League 4 and finishing third to reach the final series in their first season. The club consolidated in 2016 by finishing in sixth place from a larger field of 13 clubs.

North Brisbane FC entered an under 15's girls team and a men's over 35's team for the 2022 season to great success. Both teams went undefeated to become league champions and grand final winners in their respective grades. Team manager Chris Tully and super coaches Rebecca Robinson and Maurice Sorbella were all instrumental in these teams successes.

The O35s have since had great success for the club, going on to win Premierships in 2022 (Div 6), 2024 (Div 5) and again in 2025 (Div 4).

== Recent seasons ==
Season	League											FFA Cup
Season	Division (tier)	Pld	W	D	L	GF	GA	GD	Pts	Position	Finals Series	FFA Cup
2015	Capital League 4 (7)	18	10	2	6	46	31	15	32	3rd	Semi-final	Preliminary Round 2
2016	Capital League 4 (7)	24	12	3	9	51	57	−6	39	6th	DNQ	Preliminary Round 2
2017	Capital League 3 (7)	16	12	1	3	49	12	37	37	2nd ↑	Preliminary Final	Preliminary Round 2
2018	Capital League 2 (6)	20	8	5	7	40	29	11	29	5th	DNQ	Preliminary Round 2
2019	Capital League 2 (6)	22	10	3	9	50	34	14	34	6th	DNQ	Preliminary Round 2
2019	Women's Brisbane Premier League (1)	22	0	1	21	9	134	−125	1	12th	DNQ	N/A

Key:	Premiers / Champions	Promoted ↑	Relegated ↓

The tier is the level in the Australian soccer league system

== Honours ==
- Queensland State Cup – Winner 1993
- Brisbane Division 3 – Champions 1990
- Brisbane Division 3 – Premiers 2002
- Brisbane Division 4 – Premiers 1984
- Football Brisbane Capital League 3 – Promotion 2017
- Football Brisbane City 7 League – Grand Final Runners-up 2018
- Football Brisbane City 7 League – Grand Final Runners-up 2019
- Football Brisbane Women's City 4 League – Grand Final Runners-up 2019
- Football Brisbane Men's Capital League 2 Champions 2021
- Football Brisbane Men's Capital League 2 Reserves Champions 2021
- Football Brisbane Men's Capital League 2 Reserves Grand Final Champions 2021
- Football Brisbane Women's FQPL3 League Champions 2022
- Football Brisbane Women's FQPL3 Grand Final Runners Up 2022
- Football Brisbane Men's FQPL 4 Promoted 2022
- Football Brisbane U15 Girls Div 1 Grand Final Champions 2022
- Football Brisbane U15 Girls Div 1 League Champions 2022
- Football Brisbane Men's O35 Div 6 Grand Final Champions 2022
- Football Brisbane Men's O35 Div 6 League Champions 2022
- Football Brisbane Men's Metro 6 Grand Final Runners Up 2022
- Football Brisbane Men's O35 Div 5 League Champions 2024
- Football Brisbane Men's O35 Div 4 League Champions 2025
- Football Brisbane Men's O35 Div 4 Grand Final Champions 2025
- Football Brisbane Men's O35 Div 3 League Champions 2026
