= Underwood Park, Rochedale =

Multi-sport venue at Rochedale, Queensland

Underwood Park
- Interactive map of Underwood Park
- Location: Rochedale, Queensland
- Coordinates: 27°36′2″S 153°8′54″E
- Owner: Queensland Government
- Capacity: 5,000
- Surface: Grass

Tenant
- Rochedale Rovers

Underwood Park is a multi-sport venue located at Rochedale, Queensland. It is home to Rochedale Rovers.

== Construction ==
The grounds have 5 fields. Most are used for Football with 1 used for AFL and Cricket. The grounds also consist of a number of Netball Courts
