= Westside F.C. =

Nigerian football club

Westside FC
- Full name: Westside Football Club of Iléṣà
- Founded: 2007
- Ground: Iléṣà, Nigeria
- Chairman: Adesiji Azeez
- Manager: Akinbade Tope
- League: Nigeria Amateur League
Home colours	Away colours

Westside F.C. is a Nigerian football club, in the town of Iléṣà, in Osun State sponsored by the Ilesa West Local Government Council. They play in the third level of professional football in Nigeria, the Nigeria Amateur League Division 1. After finishing 3rd in their second division group in 2010, they bought the Amateur Division 1 slot from Anambra United F.C. after the team was relegated from the Nigeria Division 1 after the 2010 season.

== Current squad ==
Note: Flags indicate national team as defined under FIFA eligibility rules; some limited exceptions apply. Players may hold more than one non-FIFA nationality.

No.	Pos.	Nation	Player
1	GK	NGA	Azeez Azeez
2		NGA	Yinka Ojo
3		NGA	Akeem Babalola
4		NGA	Femi Arologun
5		NGA	Jimba Jamiu
6	DF	NGA	Taiwo Aborishade
7	DF	NGA	Seun Oluwadamilare
8	FW	NGA	Kehinde Adetuberu

No.	Pos.	Nation	Player
9		NGA	Akeem Famuyide
10		NGA	Bolaji Olanrewaju
11	DF	NGA	Lukman Balogun-capt
13	FW	NGA	Lateef Bolarinwa
14		NGA	Niyi Ajayi
15		NGA	Soji Olaojoyetan
16		NGA	Tope Oguntuase
31	GK	NGA	Dare Awosanmi
—		NGA	
