= Brisbane Women's Premier League =

Brisbane Women's Premier League (BPL)
- Country: Australia
- Number of clubs: 8
- Current champions: None (no 2020 finals series)
- Current premiers: Ipswich City
- Website: www.FootballBrisbane.com.au

The Brisbane Women's Premier League, BWPL, is the first tier of women's senior Football (Association Football) in Brisbane, Queensland and third overall in Australia.

The league saw changes in the 2016 Season with a new sponsor, being known as the Mt. Franklin Women's Premier League, and the introduction of a reserve league. Due to the late changes to the league it will exist with 12 clubs in 2016 and 4 clubs will be relegated and 2 promoted from the newly created Women's Capital League 1.

== Current clubs ==
The teams for 2021 Season are shown in the table below.

Team	Home Ground	Location
Annerley	Elder Oval	Greenslopes
UQFC	University of Queensland	St Lucia
The Lakes	Kinsellas Park	North Lakes
Carina	Brisbane Abruzzo Club	Carina
Grange	Lanham Park	Grange
Robina	Robina Common	Robina
Broadbeach	Nikiforides Family Park	Broadbeach
Kangaroo Point Rovers	Raymond Park	Kangaroo Point

== Previous seasons ==
Year	Relegated	Promoted Up	Note
2016	Toowong, UQFC, Souths United, Olympic FC	Virginia United, Moggill FC	Four clubs relegated to adjust the league
2017	None (see note)	Holland Park, Park Ridge, UQFC, Ipswich City	Souths, The Gap, Easts, Logan, Capalaba, Mitchelton moved to NPL only due to Football Brisbane eligibility rule change. 2018 to be 8 team league.
2018	Holland Park, Park Ridge	Taringa, North Brisbane, Coomera, Broadbeach, Southport, Robina	Four Gold Coast clubs join BWPL to return to a 12 team league.
2019	Taringa, North Brisbane	The Grange, Carina	Southport also did not enter a team for 2020.
2020	None	Kangaroo Point Rovers	2020 Premiers and runners up, Ipswich Bulls and Coomera disbanded their BWPL teams at the end of the season. Peninsula Power and Virginia entered teams in the NPL for 2021.

The teams for 2020 Season are shown in the table below.

Team	Home Ground	Location
Ipswich City Bulls	Sutton Park	Brassall
Peninsula Power	A.J. Kelly Park	Redcliffe
Annerley	Elder Oval	Greenslopes
UQFC	University of Queensland	St Lucia
The Lakes	Kinsellas Park	North Lakes
Virginia	Albert Bishop Park	
Carina	Brisbane Abruzzo Club	Carina
Grange	Lanham Park	Grange
Robina	Robina Common	Robina
Broadbeach	Nikiforides Family Park	Broadbeach
Coomera	Viney Park	Coomera

== Honours ==
Year	Premiers (Highest on the Table)	Champions (Winners of the Grand Final)
2014	Ipswich Knights FC	The Gap FC
2015	Logan FC	Annerley FC
2016	Mitchelton FC	Mitchelton FC
2017	Mitchelton FC	Annerley
2018	Annerley	Annerley
2019	The Lakes	Peninsula
2020	Ipswich Bulls	No Finals (covid)
2021	Broadbeach	Broadbeach
