= Football Sunshine Coast =

FQ Sunshine Coast
- Formation: 1968
- Headquarters: Maroochydore Regional Football Complex, Sunshine Coast
- Members: Football Queensland
- President: Chris Dunk
- Website: https://footballqueensland.com.au/sunshine-coast/

Football Queensland Sunshine Coast is the governing body of football (soccer) on the Sunshine Coast, Queensland. It is a member zone of Football Queensland and Football Federation Australia.

== History ==
The first recorded game of association football on the then North Coast occurred in July 1920.

The North Coast Football Association (NCFA) was formed in April 1921 at a meeting in Palmwoods. At that time, four clubs were affiliated with the NCFA: Buderim, Mapleton, North Arm and Palmwoods.

FQ Sunshine Coast was initially established as the North Coast Soccer Association in 1968. Teams from Caloundra and Woombye were soon formed, joined later that year by Maroochydore and Beerwah (now Beerwah-Glasshouse United). Club numbers have continued to expand and as of 2018 the Sunshine Coast Football Zone now incorporates more than 6,000 players in 18 clubs stretching from Bribie Island in the south to Gympie in the north.

As part of the reform journey, the local football community was invited to engage in a six-month state-wide consultation process based on improving four key areas of the game: governance, administration, competitions and affordability.

== Member clubs ==
Club	Date/year of formation	Website
Beerwah-Glasshouse United (Beegees)	31 July 1968 (foundation club)	https://www.beerwahglasshouseunitedfc.com/
Bribie Island Tigers	1975 (juniors) 1976 (seniors)	https://www.bribieislandfc.com.au/
Buderim Wanderers Football Club	1972 (juniors) 1979 (seniors)	https://www.wanderersfootball.com.au/
Caloundra Football Club	1968 (foundation club)	https://caloundrafootball.com.au/
Coolum Dolphins	26 February 1975	https://www.coolumfc.com
Cooroora United Football Club	Formed in 1975-76 and initially played in Gympie & District Soccer Association (from 2005 re-named Football Gympie) competitions, joined Sunshine Coast Football competitions in 2010	https://www.cufc.org.au
Flinders FC	2009	https://www.flindersfootballclub.com/
Grammar FC (Sunshine Coast Grammar School)		https://www.scgs.qld.edu.au/
Gympie United	2017	https://gympieunitedfootballclub.squadi.com/about
Kawana	1979	https://kawanafc.com.au/
Maleny Rangers	1995 (current club although earlier clubs pre-date this)	https://www.malenyrangersfc.com.au/
Maroochydore Swans	1968 (foundation club)	http://maroochydorefc.com.au/
Nambour Yandina United (NYU)	1974 (as Nambour Reds), 1997 merger of Nambour Reds & Yandina Eagles (Sunshine Coast Churches)	http://websites.sportstg.com/club_info.cgi?client=1-9393-138037-0-0
Noosa Lions	1973 as Noosa River (juniors) 1976 (seniors)	https://noosalionsfc.com/
North Shore Soccer Club	1994	https://www.northshorefootball.com.au/
Sunshine Coast FC Fire	2007	https://sunshinecoastfc.com.au//
Woombye Soccer Club	1968 (foundation club)	http://woombyesnakesfc.com/
Gympie Diggers	1973	https://websites.sportstg.com/club_info.cgi?c=1-9388-136623-0-0
Golden City (Gympie)	1983	https://websites.sportstg.com/club_info.cgi?c=1-9388-136606-0-0

== Former clubs ==
Club	Year of formation	Years of participation in Sunshine Coast Football	Honours, seasons
National Park Rovers		To be confirmed	Reserve Grade, Champions – 1976
Gympie Diggers	1973	To be confirmed	To be confirmed
Mapleton Rangers	1974 (Juniors)		
Gympie Miners	2000	2000 to 2017	Premier Reserves, Premiers – 2001
Caboolture	1969 as St Michaels Soccer Club	1996 to 2015	To be confirmed
Redcliffe		1972 – 74 (Round 4 of 1974)	
Margate		1976	
Burnside (Nambour)	1979	To be confirmed	Juniors

== Men's A Grade/1st Division/Premier League – history ==
Season	Premiers	Runners up	Champions (Grand Final winners)	Losing Grand Finalists	Grand Final score & venue	Clive Fenn Cup	Ambulance Cup
1968	Beerwah (1st) (undefeated)	Woombye	Beerwah (1st)	Woombye	5–0 @ Henzell Park, Caloundra	Beerwah	
1969	Beerwah-Glasshouse United (2nd)	Woombye	Caloundra (1st)	Beerwah-Glasshouse United	2–1 @ Henzell Park, Caloundra	Woombye 4 defeated Beerwah-Glasshouse United 0	
1970	Woombye (1st)	Beerwah-Glasshouse United	Woombye (1st)	Beerwah-Glasshouse United	4–1 @ Woombye Sportsground	Woombye	Woombye
1971	Beerwah-Glasshouse United (3rd) (undefeated)	Woombye	Beerwah-Glasshouse United (2nd)	Woombye	2–0 @ Glasshouse Mts Sportsground	Beerwah-Glasshouse United 4 defeated Caloundra 2	Beerwah-Glasshouse United 2 defeated Woombye 0
1972	Woombye White (2nd) (undefeated)	Redcliffe	Caloundra (2nd)	Woombye White	4–1 @ Cotton Tree Oval, Maroochydore	Woombye	
1973	Caloundra (1st)	Maroochydore	Caloundra (3rd)	Maroochydore	4–1 @ Henzell Park, Caloundra	Caloundra	
1974	Woombye (3rd)	Beerwah-Glasshouse United	Beerwah-Glasshouse United (3rd)	Woombye	3–2 after extra time (2–2 at full-time) @ Cotton Tree Oval, Maroochydore	Nambour Reds 2 – Woombye 1	
1975	Maroochydore (1st)	Caloundra	Beerwah-Glasshouse United (4th)	Maroochydore	4–2 @ Glasshouse Mts Sportsground	Woombye	Caloundra
1976	Beerwah-Glasshouse United (4th)	Maroochydore	Maroochydore (1st)	Woombye	2–0 @ Glasshouse Mts Sportsground	Caloundra	
1977	Beerwah-Glasshouse United (5th) (undefeated)	Nambour Reds	Beerwah-Glasshouse United (5th)	Noosa River	2–1 @ Glasshouse Mts Sportsground	Beerwah-Glasshouse United	
1978	Beerwah-Glasshouse United (6th)	Maroochydore	Beerwah-Glasshouse United (6th)	Maroochydore	2–1 @ Glasshouse Mts Sportsground	Maroochydore 4 defeated Caloundra 3 after extra time	
1979	Buderim (1st)	Beerwah-Glasshouse United	Beerwah-Glasshouse United (7th)	Buderim	4–0 @ Glasshouse Mts Sportsgound	Caloundra	
1980	Beerwah-Glasshouse United (7th)	Noosa River	Buderim (1st)	Noosa River	2–1 @ Glasshouse Mts Sportground	Beerwah-Glasshouse United	
1981	Noosa River (1st)	Woombye	Noosa River (1st)	Woombye	2–1 @ Glasshouse Mts Sportsground	Noosa	
1982	Beerwah-Glasshouse United (8th)	Noosa River	Beerwah-Glasshouse United (8th)	Noosa River	Game 1: 2–2 @ Glasshouse Mts Sportsground Replay: 2–1 @ Glasshouse Mts Sportsground	Beerwah-Glasshouse United	
1983	Noosa River (2nd)	Buderim	Noosa River (2nd)	Beerwah-Glasshouse United	5–4 after extra time (4–4 at full-time) @ Ballinger Park, Buderim	Noosa	
1984	Woombye (4th)	Noosa	Woombye (2nd)	Buderim	3–0 @ Glasshouse Mts Sportsground	Noosa	
1985	Buderim (2nd)	Noosa	Buderim (2nd)	Noosa	1–0 @ Ballinger Park, Buderim	Buderim	
1986	Noosa (3rd)	Beerwah-Glasshouse United	Noosa (3rd)	Beerwah-Glasshouse United	3–0 @ Glasshouse Mts Sportsground	Caloundra	
1987	Beerwah-Glasshouse United (9th)	Buderim	Beerwah-Glasshouse United (9th)	Buderim	3–2 @ Glasshouse Mts Sportsground		
1988	Beerwah-Glasshouse United (10th)	Noosa	Noosa (4th)	Beerwah-Glasshouse United	3–1 @ Sir Thomas Hiley Park, Tewantin		
1989	Beerwah-Glasshouse United (11th)	Noosa	Beerwah-Glasshouse United (10th)	Noosa	3–1 @ Glasshouse Mts Sportsground		
1990	Beerwah-Glasshouse United (12th)	Buderim	Buderim (3rd)	Beerwah-Glasshouse United	2–0 @ Ballinger Park, Buderim		
1991	Beerwah-Glasshouse United (13th)	Buderim	Buderim (4th)	Beerwah-Glasshouse United	3–0 @ Glasshouse Mts Sportsground		
1992	Beerwah-Glasshouse United (14th)	Buderim	Beerwah-Glasshouse United (11th)	Kawana	3–1 @ Sir Thomas Hiley Park, Tewantin		
1993	Beerwah-Glasshouse United (15th)	Buderim	Beerwah-Glasshouse United (12th)	Maroochydore	1–0 @ Glasshouse Mts Sportsground		
1994	Buderim (3rd)	Woombye	Buderim (5th)	Maroochydore	3–0 @ Ballinger Park, Buderim		
1995	Noosa (4th)	Caloundra	Caloundra (4th)	Noosa	2–1 after extra time (1–1 at full-time) @ Glasshouse Mts Sportsground		
1996	Coolum (1st) (undefeated)	Buderim	Beerwah-Glasshouse United (13th)	Buderim	5–3 after extra time (3–3 at full-time) @ Glasshouse Mts Sportsground		
1997	Noosa (5th)	Coolum	Kawana (1st)	Noosa	3–2 (golden goal in extra time) (2–2 at full-time) @ Glasshouse Mts Sportsground		
1998	Noosa (6th) (undefeated)	Maroochydore	Noosa (5th)	Maroochydore	3–0 @ Sir Thomas Hiley Park, Tewantin		
1999	Maroochydore (2nd)	Kawana	Kawana (2nd)	Maroochydore	2–0 @ Glasshouse Mts Sportsground		
2000	Noosa (7th)	Nambour-Yandina United	Noosa (6th)	Gympie Miners	2–1 (golden goal in extra time) (1–1 at full-time) @ Glasshouse Mts Sportsground		
2001	Kawana (1st) (undefeated)	Noosa	Noosa (7th)	Kawana	Noosa won 5–4 on penalties, 2–2 after extra time (2–2 at full-time) @ Quad Park (now Sunshine Coast Stadium), Kawana		
2002	Kawana (2nd) (undefeated)	Gympie Miners	Maroochydore (2nd)	Kawana	2–1 @ Glasshouse Mts Sportsground		
2003	Kawana (3rd)	Caloundra-Shelly Park United	Kawana (3rd)	Caloundra-Shelly Park United	3–0 @ Glasshouse Mts Sportsground		
2004	Kawana (4th)	Caloundra-Shelly Park United	Coolum (1st)	Caloundra-Shelly Park United	3–0 @ Glasshouse Mts Sportsground		
2005	Kawana (5th)	Coolum	Kawana (4th)	Coolum	3–1 after extra time (1–1 at full-time) @ Martins Creek Regional Football Complex, Maroochydore		
2006	Kawana (6th)	Caloundra-Shelly Park United	Kawana (5th)	Maroochydore	Kawana won 5–4 on penalties, 4–4 after extra time (3–3 at full-time) @ Martins Creek Regional Football Complex, Maroochydore		
2007	Buderim (4th) (undefeated)	Maroochydore	Buderim (6th)	Maroochydore	4–3 @ Martins Creek Regional Football Complex, Maroochydore		
2008	Buderim (5th)	Maroochydore	Buderim (7th)	Maroochydore	1–0 after extra time (0–0 at full-time) @ Martins Creek Regional Football Complex, Maroochydore		
2009	Maroochydore (3rd)	Woombye	Maroochydore (3rd)	Woombye	2–1 @ Martins Creek Regional Football Complex, Maroochydore		
2010	Buderim (6th)	Woombye	Woombye (3rd)	Buderim	3–1 after extra time (1–1 at full-time) @ Martins Creek Regional Football Complex, Maroochydore		
2011	Maroochydore (4th)	Woombye	Woombye (4th)	Maroochydore	2–1 @ Martins Creek Regional Football Complex, Maroochydore		
2012	Kawana (7th)	Maroochydore	Maroochydore (4th)	Kawana	3–2 @ Martins Creek Regional Football Complex, Maroochydore		
2013	Maroochydore (5th)	Buderim	Maroochydore (5th)	Woombye	4–1 @ Martins Creek Regional Football Complex, Maroochydore		
2014	Kawana (8th)	Woombye	Woombye (5th)	Kawana	5–2 @ Martins Creek Regional Football Complex, Maroochydore		
2015	Woombye (5th)	Kawana	Kawana (6th)	Woombye	5–3 @ Sunshine Coast Stadium, Kawana		
2016	Maroochydore (6th)	Kawana	Kawana (7th)	Woombye	First Grand Final @ Sunshine Coast Stadium, Kawana was washed out Replay 4–2 @ Martins Creek Regional Football Complex, Maroochydore		
2017	Noosa (8th)	Kawana	Maroochydore (6th)	Noosa	2–0 @ Sunshine Coast Stadium, Kawana		
2018	Noosa (9th) (undefeated)	Caloundra	Noosa (8th)	Kawana	4–1 after extra time (1–1 at full-time) @ Martins Creek Regional Football Complex, Maroochydore		
2019	Noosa (10th)	Nambour Yandina United	Kawana (8th)	Nambour Yandina United	4–0 @ Martins Creek Regional Football Complex, Maroochydore		
2020	Noosa (11th) (undefeated)	Beerwah-Glasshouse United					
2021	Nambour Yandina United (1st)	Noosa	Kawana (9th)	Woombye	2-0 @ Martins Creek Regional Football Complex, Maroochydore		
2022	Maroochydore (7th) (undefeated)	Kawana	Maroochydore (7th)	Kawana	2-1 @ Sunshine Coast Stadium, Kawana		
2023	Caloundra (2nd)	Noosa	Noosa (9th)	Kawana	2-0 @ Sunshine Coast Stadium, Kawana		
2024	Caloundra (3rd)	Noosa	Caloundra (5th)	Noosa	3-2 after extra time @ Sunshine Coast Stadium, Kawana. It was 2-all at full time.		
2025	Caloundra (4th) (undefeated)	Noosa	Woombye (6th)	Caloundra	4-2 @ Sunshine Coast Stadium, Kawana		
2026	Noosa (12th)	Woombye	Noosa (10th)	Kawana	3-2 after extra time at Sunshine Coast Stadium, Kawana		

Ref:

== Men's A Grade/1st Division/Premier League – summary ==
Club	Premierships	Seasons	Championships (Grand Final wins)	Seasons
Beerwah-Glasshouse United (Beegees)	15	1968, 1969, 1971, 1976, 1977, 1978, 1980, 1982, 1987, 1988, 1989, 1990, 1991, 1992, 1993	13	1968, 1971, 1974, 1975, 1977, 1978, 1979, 1982, 1987, 1989, 1992, 1993, 1996
Noosa (Noosa River)	12	1981, 1983, 1986, 1995, 1997, 1998, 2000, 2017, 2018, 2019, 2020, 2026	10	1981, 1983, 1986, 1988, 1998, 2000, 2001, 2018, 2023, 2026
Kawana	8	2001, 2002, 2003, 2004, 2005, 2006, 2012, 2014	9	1997, 1999, 2003, 2005, 2006, 2015, 2016, 2019, 2021
Buderim	6	1979, 1985, 1994, 2007, 2008, 2010	7	1980, 1985, 1990, 1991, 1994, 2007, 2008
Maroochydore	7	1975, 1999, 2009, 2011, 2013, 2016, 2022	7	1976, 2002, 2009, 2012, 2013, 2017, 2022
Woombye (Woombye White)	5	1970, 1972, 1974, 1984, 2015	6	1970, 1984, 2010, 2011, 2014, 2025
Caloundra	4	1973, 2023, 2024, 2025	5	1969, 1972, 1973, 1995, 2024
Coolum	1	1996	1	2004
Nambour Yandina United (Nambour Reds)	1	2021	0	
No competition			1	2020
Totals	59		59	

Ref:

== Men's A Grade/1st Division/Premier League – Premiership/Grand Final Double ==
Club	Premiership & Grand Final Doubles (A Grade/1st Division/Premier League)
Beerwah-Glasshouse United	9 – 1968, 1971, 1977, 1978, 1982, 1987, 1989, 1992, 1993
Noosa	7 – 1981, 1983, 1986, 1998, 2000, 2018, 2026
Buderim	4 – 1985, 1994, 2007, 2008
Kawana	3 – 2003, 2005, 2006
Maroochydore	3 – 2009, 2013, 2022
Caloundra	2 – 1973, 2024
Woombye	2 – 1970, 1984

== Women's/ladies senior competition – history ==
Season	Premiers	Champions (Grand Final winners)	Grand Final result	Goalscorers
1977	Beerwah-Glasshouse United (Green) (1st)	Beerwah-Glasshouse United (Green) (1st)	Beerwah-Glasshouse United (Green) 3 defeated Beerwah-Glasshouse United (White) 1	
1979	Beerwah-Glasshouse United			
1980		Beerwah-Glasshouse United (2nd)	Beerwah-Glasshouse United 3 defeated Woombye 0	
1981	Beerwah-Glasshouse United (2nd)	Beerwah-Glasshouse United (3rd)	Beerwah-Glasshouse United 2 defeated Caloundra 1	Beerwah-Glasshouse United - Sharon Wendt, Debbie Murch Caloundra - Unknown
1982	Noosa (1st)	Noosa (1st)	Noosa 2 defeated Maroochydore 0	
1983	Caloundra (1st)	Caloundra (1st)	Caloundra 1 defeated Beerwah-Glasshouse United 0	
1984	Beerwah-Glasshouse United (3rd)	Beerwah-Glasshouse United (4th)		
1985	No competition	No competition		
1986	Woombye (1st)	Buderim (1st)	Buderim 2 defeated Caloundra 0	Buderim - Zoe Hickey (2)
1987	Buderim (undefeated) (1st)	Buderim (2nd)	Buderim 3 defeated Caloundra 0	Buderim - Leanne Burnett (2), own goal
1988	Buderim (2nd)	Buderim (3rd)	Buderim 2 defeated Caloundra 0	
1989	Beerwah-Glasshouse United (4th)	Buderim (4th)	Buderim 2 defeated Beerwah-Glasshouse United 0	
1990	Beerwah-Glasshouse United (5th)	Woombye (1st)	Woombye 3 defeated Buderim 1 (Replay), Woombye 1 drew with Buderim 1	Woombye - Shirley Russell (2), Jenny Aitken Buderim - Anne Exelby
1991	Caloundra (2nd) (undefeated)	Caloundra (2nd)	Caloundra 2 defeated Woombye 1	
1992	Caloundra (3rd)	Kawana (1st)	Kawana 1 defeated Caloundra 0	Kawana - Glenda Cobby
1993	Caloundra (undefeated) (4th)	Kawana (2nd)	Kawana 2 defeated Caloundra 0	Kawana - Kelly Bishop (2)
1994	Caloundra (5th)	Caloundra (3rd)	Caloundra 2 defeated Beerwah-Glasshouse United 0	Caloundra - Angela Burns (2)
1995	Caloundra (6th)	Caloundra (4th)	Caloundra 1 defeated Maroochydore 0	Caloundra - Cathie Maxworthy
1996	Caloundra (Eagles) (7th)	Caloundra (Eagles) (5th)	Caloundra (Eagles) 3 defeated Coolum 1	Caloundra - Angela Burns (2), Samantha Waugh Coolum - Own goal
1997	Woombye (undefeated) (2nd)	Woombye (2nd)	Woombye 2 defeated Beerwah-Glasshouse United 0	Woombye - Kylie Claridge (penalty), Rosemarie Heath
1998	Kawana (undefeated) (1st)	Caloundra (6th)	Caloundra 3 defeated Maroochydore 2	Caloundra - Angela Burns, Cathie Maxworthy, Donna Jende Maroochydore - Emma Koch, Jamie Lancaster
1999	Kawana (2nd)	Buderim (White) (5th)	Buderim (White) 1 defeated Kawana 0	Buderim (White) - Tabitha Papworth
2000	Buderim (3rd)	Kawana (3rd)	Kawana 4 defeated Buderim 0	Kawana - Kelly Bishop (2), Melissa Bull, Haeranui McKenzie
2001	Buderim (Black) (4th)	Buderim (Black) (6th)	Buderim (Black) 3 defeated Caloundra SPU 1	Buderim Black - Kacey Purnell, Joy Clark, Leah Godfrey Caloundra SPU - Gemma Thorpe
2002	Buderim (5th)	Caloundra SPU (7th)	Caloundra SPU 2 defeated Buderim 1 after extra time	Caloundra SPU - Lisa Newman (Golden goal in extra time), Unknown Buderim - Unknown
2003	Caloundra SPU (8th)	Caloundra SPU (8th)	Caloundra SPU 3 defeated Buderim 1	
2004	Caloundra SPU (9th)	Caloundra SPU (9th)	Caloundra SPU 3 defeated Maroochydore (Blue) 0	Caloundra SPU - Chrissie Wagner, Lisa Newman, Lia Barlow
2005	Maroochydore (1st)	Maroochydore (1st)	Maroochydore 1 defeated Gympie Miners 0	
2006	Maroochydore (undefeated) (2nd)	Maroochydore (2nd)	Maroochydore 4 defeated Gympie 0	
2007	Coolum (1st)	Buderim (7th)	Buderim 2 defeated Coolum 0	
2008	Sunshine Coast Fire (undefeated) (1st)	Sunshine Coast Fire (1st)	Sunshine Coast Fire 3 defeated Caboolture 1	
2009	Sunshine Coast Fire (2nd)	Sunshine Coast Fire (2nd)	Sunshine Coast Fire 4 defeated Caloundra SPU 0	
2010	Maroochydore (3rd)	Maroochydore (3rd)	Maroochydore 1 defeated Buderim 0	
2011	Maroochydore (4th)	Maroochydore (4th)	Maroochydore 3 defeated Caboolture 1	
2012	Maroochydore (5th)	Maroochydore (5th)	Maroochydore 2 defeated Caboolture 0	
2013	Maroochydore (undefeated) (6th)	Maroochydore (6th)	Maroochydore 3 defeated Coolum 0	
2014	Maroochydore (7th)	Maroochydore (7th)	Maroochydore 4 defeated Kawana 1	
2015	Maroochydore (undefeated) (8th)	Maroochydore (8th)	Maroochydore 6 defeated Caboolture 2	
2016	Maroochydore (9th)	Maroochydore (9th)	Maroochydore 2 defeated Woombye 1	
2017	Buderim (undefeated) (6th)	Buderim (8th)	Buderim 3 defeated Woombye 2	Buderim - Samara Christmas, Unknown Woombye - Unknown
2018	Beerwah-Glasshouse United (6th)	Caloundra (10th)	Caloundra defeated Beerwah-Glasshouse United 4-3 on penalties (1-1 after extra time, 1-1 at full-time)	Caloundra - Elif Albyrak Beerwah-Glasshouse United - Melissa Weckert
2019	Beerwah-Glasshouse United (7th)	Beerwah-Glasshouse United (5th)	Beerwah-Glasshouse United 1 defeated Maroochydore 0 after extra time (0-0 at full-time)	Beerwah-Glasshouse United - Melissa Weckert
2020	Maroochydore (10th)			
2021	Beerwah-Glasshouse United (8th)	Nambour Yandina United (1st)	Nambour Yandina United 3 defeated Sunshine Coast Fire 0	Nambour Yandina United - Kiara Rychvalsky (2), Jasmine Evans
2022	Woombye (3rd)	Maroochydore (10th)	Maroochydore defeated Sunshine Coast Fire 1-0 after extra time. It was 0-all at full time.	Maroochydore - Ruby Postan
2023	Beerwah-Glasshouse United (9th)	Maroochydore (11th)	Maroochydore 2 defeated Noosa 1	
2024	Maroochydore (11th)	Maroochydore (12th)	Maroochydore 3 defeated Noosa 1	Maroochydore - Drew Aiken (2), Ruby Postan Noosa - Jessica Doyle
2025	Maroochydore (undefeated) (12th)	Maroochdore (13th)	Maroochdore 3 defeated Woombye 2 after extra time. It was 2-all at full time.	Maroochydore - Gabby Postan, Ruby Miezitis, Danae Pryce (in extra time) Woombye - Georgia Dixson, Darcy Simpkins
2026	Woombye (4th)	Woombye (3rd)	Woombye defeated Noosa on penalties after extra time	

== Women's/ladies senior competition – summary ==
Club	Premierships	Seasons	Championships (Grand Final wins)	Seasons
Maroochydore (Blue)	12	2005, 2006, 2010, 2011, 2012, 2013, 2014, 2015, 2016, 2020, 2024, 2025	13	2005, 2006, 2010, 2011, 2012, 2013, 2014, 2015, 2016, 2022, 2023, 2024, 2025
Caloundra (Eagles, SPU)	9	1983, 1991, 1992, 1993, 1994, 1995, 1996, 2003, 2004	10	1983, 1991, 1994, 1995, 1996, 1998, 2002, 2003, 2004, 2018
Beerwah-Glasshouse United (Green)	9	1977, 1981, 1984, 1989, 1990, 2018, 2019, 2021, 2023	5	1977, 1980, 1981, 1984, 2019
Buderim (White) (Black)	6	1987, 1988, 2000, 2001, 2002, 2017	8	1986, 1987, 1988, 1989, 1999, 2001, 2007, 2017
Woombye	4	1986, 1997, 2022, 2026	3	1990, 1997, 2026
Kawana	2	1998, 1999	3	1992, 1993, 2000
Sunshine Coast Fire	2	2008, 2009	2	2008, 2009
Noosa	1	1982	1	1982
Coolum	1	2007	0	
Nambour Yandina United	0		1	2021
No competition	1	1985	2	1985, 2020
Totals	47		47	

== Women's/ladies senior competition – Premiership/Grand Final Double ==
Club	Premiership & Grand Final Double
Maroochydore (Blue)	11 - 2005, 2006, 2010, 2011, 2012, 2013, 2014, 2015, 2016, 2024, 2025
Caloundra (Eagles, SPU)	7 - 1983, 1991, 1994, 1995, 1996, 2003, 2004
Buderim (Black)	4 - 1987, 1988, 2001, 2017
Beerwah-Glasshouse United (Green)	4 - 1977, 1981, 1984, 2019
Noosa	2 - 1982, 2022
Sunshine Coast Fire	2 - 2008, 2009
Woombye	2 - 1997, 2026

== Player of the Year - Female & Male ==
Season	Female Player of the Year	Club	Male Player of the Year	Club
1991			Les Kunde	Caloundra
1992			Shaun De Courcy	Beerwah-Glasshouse United
1993			Carl Harrison	Noosa
1994			Jason Dunn	Buderim
1995			Vaughan Scriggins	Coolum
1996			Kevin Raynor	Maroochydore & Caloundra
1997			Craig Hawkins	Coolum
1998			Michael Williams (1st)	Noosa
1999	Terri Daines (1st)	Buderim	Garry Blewer	Buderim
2000	Alex Jancevski	Noosa	Joe Gagetti	Noosa
2001	Terri Daines (2nd)	Buderim	Michael Williams (2nd)	Noosa
2002	Terri Daines (3rd)	Buderim	Craig Paulett	Buderim
2003	Terri Daines (4th)	Maroochydore	Michael Williams (3rd)	Noosa
2004	Naomi Donlen	Nambour Yandina United	Jai Cross	Coolum
2005	Terri Daines (5th)	Maroochydore	Alastair Lackie	Caloundra
2006	Melissa Weckert (1st)	Coolum	Tyson Holmes	Kawana
2007	Melissa Weckert (2nd)	Maroochydore	Adam Cross (1st) & Luke Mealing	Gympie Miners & Woombye
2008	Erica Elze	Maroochydore	Adam Jeffs	Maroochydore
2009	Hannah Owen	Nambour Yandina United	Sam Bennett	Nambour Yandina United
2010	Kieran Sharma & Vanessa Weaver	Caloundra & Coolum	Mick Sticklen	Coolum
2011	Jessica Davy	Caboolture	Luke Ricketts	Kawana
2012	Melissa Weckert (3rd)	Maroochydore	Ryan Delahunty (1st)	Kawana
2013	Aliese Hoffmann	Maroochydore	Ben Muzyka (1st)	Caboolture
2014	Sofie Persson & Stefanie Mayhew (1st)	Maroochydore & Caboolture	Ben Muzyka (2nd)	Caboolture
2015	Stefanie Mayhew (2nd)	Caboolture	Brenton Fox	Caboolture
2016	Chelsea Scarff	Maroochydore	Ryan Delahunty (2nd)	Kawana
2017	Danielle Bishop-Kinlyside (1st)	Noosa	Luke Devitt	Beerwah-Glasshouse United
2018	Tiffany Scarff (1st)	Maroochydore	Adam Cross (2nd)	Coolum
2019	Tiffany Scarff (2nd)	Maroochydore	Mackenzie Smith	Caloundra
2020	Kiara Rychvalsky	Nambour Yandina United	Cameron Nairn	Beerwah-Glasshouse United
2021	Amy Higgins	Beerwah-Glasshouse United	Michael Holden	Maroochydore
2022	Danae Pryce	Maroochydore	Michael Holden	Maroochydore
2023	Kirra-Leigh Crouch	Beerwah-Glasshouse United	Max Adey	Noosa
2024	Ashleigh Finzel	Noosa	Ethan Galbraith	Caloundra
2025	Georgia Dixson	Woombye	Bryn Grigg	Nambour Yandina United
2026	Danielle Bishop-Kinlyside (2nd)	Noosa	Ollie Blackmore	Noosa

Ref:

== Seniors – Most Goals Scored – Male and Female ==
In late 1970, Charlie Rocker, a prolific scorer for Woombye, was killed. The Charlie Rocker Memorial Trophy was established in 1971 to recognise the senior male player who had scored the most goals in the season. The inaugural winner was Ray Dann of Beerwah-Glasshouse United. Fittingly, Charlie's brother Horst won the trophy in 1973, and his nephew Scott first won the award for most goals scored in 1998; he won the award six times.

Season	Men's player	Club	Goals scored	Women's player	Club	Goals scored
1971	Ray Dann	Beerwah-Glasshouse United	17 *			
1972	Peter Cox (Junior)	Woombye				
1973	Horst Rocker	Caloundra				
1974	Dick Watson	Nambour Reds	16 **			
1975	Jim Nipperess	Maroochydore				
1976	Lyle Bryce (1st)	Beerwah-Glasshouse United	54			
1977	Lyle Bryce (2nd)	Beerwah-Glasshouse United	22			
1978	Peter Deeks	Maroochydore	23			
1979	Lyle Bryce (3rd)	Beerwah-Glasshouse United	19			
1980	Lyle Bryce (4th)	Beerwah-Glasshouse United	32			
1981	Tim Omaye (1st)	Noosa				
1982	Tim Omaye (2nd)	Noosa				
1983	Steve Walsh (1st)	Noosa	43			
1984	Steve Walsh (2nd)	Noosa	26			
1985	Steve Walsh (3rd)	Noosa	24			
1986	Steve Walsh (4th)	Noosa	28			
1987	Paul Lees	Buderim	12			
1988	David Payne	Beerwah-Glasshouse United	20			
1989	Damien Rosenthal	Noosa	19			
1990	Jason Dunn (1st)	Buderim	18			
1991	Shaun De Courcy (1st)	Beerwah-Glasshouse United	17			
1992	Shaun De Courcy (2nd)	Beerwah-Glasshouse United	35			
1993	Shaun De Courcy (3rd)	Beerwah-Glasshouse United	17			
1994	Jason Dunn (2nd)	Buderim	35	Angela Burns (1st)	Caloundra	52
1995	Shane Clark	Coolum	15	Angela Burns (2nd)	Caloundra	28
1996	Damien Allen	Maroochydore	21	Angela Burns (3rd)	Caloundra (Eagles)	30
1997	Shaun De Courcy (4th)	Beerwah-Glasshouse United	22	Joy Clark (1st)	Woombye	26
1998	Scott Rocker (1st)	Noosa	40	Joy Clark (2nd) & Sofie Jonnson	Woombye & Kawana	Unknown
1999	Rodney Allen	Maroochydore	15	Terri Daines & Sharelle Eggmolesse	Buderim & Kawana	Unknown
2000	Mick Preston	Gympie Diggers	14			
2001	John Murphy	Kawana	19			
2002	Scott Rocker (2nd)	Kawana	30			
2003	Scott Rocker (3rd)	Kawana	40			
2004	Trevor Morrison	Coolum	31			
2005	Scott Rocker (4th)	Kawana	27	Melissa Weckert (1st)	Maroochydore	29
2006	Scott Rocker (5th)	Kawana	19	Melissa Weckert (2nd)	Maroochydore	34
2007	Scott Rocker (6th)	Buderim	30	Melissa Weckert (3rd)	Coolum	28
2008	Luke Alderson (1st)	Woombye	19	Melissa Weckert (4th)	Sunshine Coast Fire	12
2009	Luke Alderson (2nd)	Woombye	22	Katrina Bell	Caloundra	27
2010	Adam Cross	Cooroora	20	Sophie Lamberton	Buderim	28
2011	Luke Alderson (3rd)	Woombye	24	Melissa Weckert (5th)	Maroochydore	29
2012	Luke Alderson (4th) & Matt Thompson	Woombye & Noosa	29	Melissa Weckert (6th)	Maroochydore	31
2013	Luke Alderson (5th)	Woombye	33	Siobhan Macken	Maroochydore	34
2014	Luke Alderson (6th)	Woombye	23	Sofie Persson	Maroochydore	30
2015	Luke Alderson (7th)	Woombye	33	Melissa Weckert (7th)	Maroochydore	18
2016	Ryan Delahunty	Kawana	26	Chelsea Scarff	Maroochydore	30
2017	Luke Alderson (8th)	Woombye	25	Samara Christmas	Buderim	97
2018	Luke Alderson (9th)	Woombye	25	Chanel Harris (1st)	Caloundra	27
2019	Oliver Colam	Kawana	21	Tiffany Scarff	Maroochydore	33
2020	Cameron Nairn	Beerwah-Glasshouse United	27	Chanel Harris (2nd)	Caloundra	29
2021	Michael Holden	Maroochydore	22	Kiara Rychvalsky	Nambour Yandina United	19
2022	Ryan Delahunty (2nd)	Kawana	14	Georgia Dixson (1st)	Woombye	16
2023	Ethan Galbraith & Luke Alderson (10th)	Caloundra & Woombye	12	Gabby Postan	Maroochydore	28
2024	Alex Newcome (1st)	Woombye	22	Georgia Dixson (2nd)	Woombye	20
2025	Riley Campbell & Alex Newcome (2nd)	Caloundra & Woombye	26	Georgia Dixson (3rd)	Woombye	27
2026	Sam Standish	Nambour Yandina United	21	Melissa Weckert (8th)	Beerwah Glasshouse United	15

- The figure of 17 goals scored by Ray Dann in 1971 is based on incomplete newspaper reports.
  - The figure of 16 goals scored by Dick Watson in 1974 is based on incomplete newspaper reports, and includes three goals scored against Redcliffe, who withdrew from the competition after four rounds.

Ref:

== Australian players ==
To date, two players, both from the 1920s, have played for Australia whilst playing on the then North Coast, now Sunshine Coast.

In addition, two Matildas began their football journeys in Sunshine Coast competitions. Larissa Crummer (Matildas Cap Number 192) played for Coolum & Noosa in her formative years. Kyra Cooney-Cross (Matildas Cap Number 210) began playing football with Coolum as a 4 year old. In 2008, after two seasons of "Squirts" football, she played as the only female in the Under 6 Bli Bli United Braves side.

Wilfred Bratton (Australian Cap 12), who was usually referred to as Wilf Bratton (or even Bratten) was born in 1898 in England probably in or near Sheffield. At the age of 15, he migrated to Australia and settled at Flaxton or Palmwoods where he was employed as a farmhand. He enlisted for World War 1 in May 1915 as a private and was wounded in service, a victim of gassing and severe trench fever. He returned to Australia in March 1919. In 1928 Bratton wrote to the newspapers about a game of football played between his 3rd Australian Division and the Royal Air Force at Bailleul (Somme on the Western Front) in the winter of 1917.

Bratton played for Palmwoods in August 1920 in their friendly games against Buderim before the formation of the North Coast Football Association (NCFA) in 1921. In the first season of the NCFA in 1921, he played for Mapleton. Bratton continued to play for Mapleton until 1928 and was even club president.

In 1922, whilst playing for Mapleton, he was selected in the first Australian men's football team, which toured New Zealand from May to July that year. He scored the second goal in the Australian team's first ever game against Wanganui (won 3–1) and the equaliser in the second international against New Zealand played at Athletic Park in Wellington (drew 1–1). All up Bratton played for Australia on eight occasions, scoring three goals.

Jack White (Australian Cap 20) was born in Grafton, New South Wales, grew up in South Africa and moved to Nambour in the early-1920s where he was a sugar and citrus farmer. He played football in South Africa as a junior, having represented his country at junior level. In the inaugural North Coast Football Association season in 1921, he played for North Arm. In 1923, he captained the powerful North Arm club and the North Coast representative side. White was such a talent that in June 1923 he was lured to Brisbane to play for Pineapple Rovers.

In 1923, whilst playing for North Arm, White was selected to play for Queensland and Australia against the touring New Zealand side. White made his Australian debut in June 1923 at the Brisbane Cricket Ground in a 2–1 win over New Zealand. White represented Australia three times; in the 1923 internationals against New Zealand in Brisbane (won 2–1) and Sydney (lost 2–3), and against the touring Canadian team in 1924 at the Brisbane Cricket Ground (won 3–2).
