= Rochedale Rovers FC =

Football club in Queensland, Australia

Rochedale Rovers
- Full name: Rochedale Rovers Football Club
- Nickname: Rovers
- Founded: 1972; 54 years ago
- Ground: Underwood Park
- Capacity: 5,000
- President: Jonny McKain
- Head Coach: Daniel Varma
- League: NPL Queensland
- 2025: 2nd of 12, FQPL (promoted)
- Website: http://www.rochedalerovers.com
Home colours	Away colours

Rochedale Rovers are a semi-professional football club which plays at Underwood Park in Priestdale, Queensland, Australia and currently competes in the Queensland Premier League with senior and junior teams competing in both Football Queensland and Football Brisbane competitions.

== History ==
In November 1972, local resident Tommy Vance placed an advertisement in the local paper looking for people interested in forming a football club on a small field behind the historic Glen Hotel at Eight Mile Plains.

In 1973, Rovers started their first ever game with a dominant 4-0 victory over Redlands United, all four goals coming from the boot of Darren Byrne.

From the start, local business identities came forward to help, including the late Graham Hogg of Graham Hogg Real Estate, Brian Fitzgibbon of the Glen Hotel and John Beerling from Galeprufe Garages.

Within a few years the club had leased land at Underwood Park and with the help of a small army of volunteers had developed three fields (fenced and floodlit), a canteen, office and showers.

In the late 1970s a brick clubhouse was built with grandstands, full playing amenities, canteen and sports bar, at the time being one of the best facilities in Queensland.

In 2019, the original clubhouse was demolished to make way for a start of the art clubhouse based around the design of the original featuring the new Tom Vance and Keiran Cooper Grandstands and a full length verandah (extending the seating capacity to 500+) as well as a spectacular entrance way, top floor canteen and bar facilities.

Beneath the grandstand, which overlooks the main field, are modern changing rooms and storage facilities.

To date, Rochedale have collected six Premierships (1986, 1999, 2007, 2008, 2010, 2017), six Championships (1985, 1986, 1993, 1995, 2011, 2019) and have produced three internationals in Jon McKain (Socceroos), Chris O'Connor (Olyroos), and Luke Brattan (Under20s).

Former players turned professional include Brian MacNicol, Shane Huke, Tim Smits, Matt Mundy, James Donachie and Steve Fitzsimmons.

Of teams still active, only Lions, Bardon Latrobe and Brisbane City have won more Premierships.

== Silverware ==
Premierships: 1986, 1999, 2007, 2008, 2010, 2017

Runners-up: 2011, 2009, 2006, 2005, 1998, 1996, 1995, 1993, 1992, 1991, 2022

Championships: 1984, 1985, 1993, 1995, 2011, 2019

Runners-up: 2012, 2010, 2006, 1998, 1992, 1991
