= Mt Gravatt Hawks FC =

- Full name: Mount Gravatt Hawks Football Club
- Nickname: Mounties
- Founded: 1960
- Ground: Dittmer Park, Mount Gravatt
- Manager: Arvind Naidu
- League: FQPL 3 – Metro
- 2025: 5th of 13
- Website: http://www.hawksfc.org.au/
Home colours	Away colours

Mt Gravatt Hawks FC is an Australian soccer club from Mount Gravatt, Queensland, a suburb of Brisbane. The club was formed in 1960 and has a prestigious history as holders of several titles including the Ampol Cup, State Championship and several State League Premierships. The club currently plays in the Football Queensland Premier League 3 – Metro.

== History ==
Mt Gravatt Soccer Club was founded in 1960 and over many years has prioritised the development of junior players. The club was originally based at the Mt Gravatt Showgrounds but as the popularity of soccer grew the club relocated to more extensive surroundings at Dittmer Park, Klumpp Road. The concept of a soccer club was originally put forward by the management committee of the Mt Gravatt Youth and Recreation Club and for the first couple of years the club was known as Mountain Rangers before changing to Mt Gravatt Junior Soccer Club in 1962. In those early years the club concentrated on junior soccer but in 1965 a feeder arrangement was established with the Excelsior Club, based at Stone's Corner and the revamped team won promotion to Queensland Division 3. In 1966 the name of the senior team was changed from Mt Gravatt Excelsior to Mt Gravatt Soccer Club and a further promotion followed in 1967.

The most successful period in the club's history was in the early 1980s when the club achieved 4 premiership titles, winning the Queensland State League in 1980 and 1981 and the Brisbane Premier League in 1983 in 1984. One of their premiership successes in 1981 was further consolidated with the club going on to win the Queensland Grand Final and become state champions.

The club also achieved a number of cup successes at that time winning the President's Trophy in 1981 and again in 1984 and the Golden Circle Trophy in 1986. However their biggest cup success came a few years later in 1991 when Mt Gravatt lifted the Ampol Cup, the Queensland State cup competition.

Mt Gravatt Soccer Club entered the National League Cup in 1980 and again in 1981. In 1980 the club won 1–0 away to Brisbane City in the first round but lost 4–2 at home to Brisbane Lions in the second round (the last 16 of the competition). The following season they departed the competition in the first round after losing 3–1 away to Brisbane City.

Perhaps the most prestigious match that the club has hosted was the game against the Australian U23 Olympics team in July 1997 which proved a close encounter with the home side going down 2–1.

Mt Gravatt is affiliated to Football Brisbane and is currently one of the larger clubs in Brisbane with over 400 juniors, 160 senior players and 45 women and junior girls. There are fourteen Senior Men's teams with Brisbane Premier League and Reserves, U18, City League 2, 3, 4, 5, 6, 7, O'35s and O'45s. The Women compete in the Women's Capital League and City League competition and the junior players in in-house programs from Under 3 - Under 8 and Football Brisbane competitions from Under 8 to Under 16.

The success of the club's junior section is formidable with 4 current Australian internationals, namely Matt McKay, Jade North, Jon McKain and Nathan Coe, having been members of the club.

== Season to season ==
Season	Tier	League	Pos.	Pl.	W	D	L	GS	GA	Pts	Movements
1998	2	Queensland Premier League	8th	27	6	7	14	40	50	25	
1999	2	Queensland Premier League	9th	27	6	5	16	36	70	23	
2000	2	Queensland Premier League	10th	27	4	6	17	29	66	18	
2001	2	Queensland Premier League	10th	22	5	2	15	27	56	17	
2002	2	Queensland Premier League	12th	22	2	4	16	14	61	10	Relegated
2003	3	Brisbane Premier Division 1	7th	26	8	7	9	32	34	31	
2004	3	Brisbane Premier Division 1	4th	22	11	5	6	42	28	38	
2005	3	Brisbane Premier Division 1	1st	22	16	5	1	48	9	53	Promoted
2006	2	Brisbane Premier League	10th	22	6	0	16	25	43	18	
2007	2	Brisbane Premier League	8th	22	6	6	10	36	41	24	
2008	3	Brisbane Premier League	10th	22	8	1	13	34	55	25	
2009	3	Brisbane Premier League	7th	24	10	3	11	35	37	33	
2010	3	Brisbane Premier League	12th	26	7	5	14	39	80	26	
2011	3	Brisbane Premier League	13th	26	6	1	19	28	83	19	Relegated
2012	4	Brisbane Premier Division 1	5th	26	13	4	9	66	51	43	
2013	3	Capital League 1	3rd	22	13	3	6	60	25	42	
2014	3	Capital League 1	8th	22	6	5	11	22	33	23	
2015	3	Capital League 1	7th	22	8	5	8	22	33	23	
2016	3	Capital League 1	10th	22	5	5	12	35	51	20	
2017	3	Capital League 1	10th	22	6	5	11	34	44	23	
2019	3	Capital League 1	8th|								
2020	3	Capital League 1	3rd								
2021	3	Brisbane Premier League	5th								
2022	3	FQPL3	11th								
2023	3	FQPL3	7th								
2024	3	FQPL3	5th								
2025	3	FQPL3	5th								

== Players ==
=== Brisbane Premier League and Reserve Squad ===
Abdi Ali

Ali Maisam

Ben Farquhar

Brandon Blatchford

Celestine Yawatu

Deacon Galea

Dominic Stevens-Robert

Dylan Rose

Izumi Sekino

Jacky Holmes

Jacob Downey

Jarred Kool

Jesse Shepherd

Joseph Cunnane

Joshua Brown

Juan Esteban Aristizabal

Juan Melo

Kieren Strachan

Lachlan Buckingham

Levi Thomas

Liam South

Logan Ford

Mark Kartadinata

Mathew Berkeley

Matthew Andrews

Matthew Grigg

Mohamed Hersi

Saeed Mohamed

Sami Munir

Shunta Tanabe

Tarquin Smith

Todd Powe

Tyson Harrington

Wigang Noh

Yuttana Taotong

Zaki Ahmed

== Honours ==
- Queensland Grand Final: 1981 Winners
- Queensland State League: 1980 Winners
- Queensland State League: 1981 Winners
- Brisbane Premier League: 1983 Winners
- Brisbane Premier League: 1984 Winners
- Brisbane Premier Division One: 2005 Winners
- Queensland President's Trophy: 1981 Winners
- Queensland President's Trophy: 1984 Winners
- Queensland Golden Circle Trophy: 1986 Winners
- Queensland Ampol Cup: 1991 Winners

The following international players were members of the club as juniors:

- (Australia) Matt McKay
- (Australia) Jon McKain
- (Australia) Jade North
- (Australia) Nathan Coe
- (Australia) Katrina Gorry
- (Australia) Laura Alleway
- (Australia) Alicia Ferguson
