= Football Queensland Metro =

- Predecessor: See Antecedent Governing Bodies
- Formation: 2007; 19 years ago as Football Brisbane
- Headquarters: Brisbane, Queensland
- Main organ: Football Queensland
- Website: Official website
- Formerly called: Football Brisbane

Football Queensland Metro is a Football Queensland administrative zone encompassing the greater Brisbane area in Queensland, Australia, with surrounding areas including Caboolture, Ipswich, Redland City and Logan City. The premier men's football competition is the Football Queensland Premier League – Metro and the premier women's football competition is the Football Queensland Women's Premier League 3 − Metro. The administrative zone also has a numerous variety of lower divisions for both men and women, as well as academy and junior competitions to develop football (soccer) and fitness within the region.

The administrative zone also encompasses teams competing in state competitions, along with Brisbane Roar and Brisbane Roar Women − Queensland's only teams participating in A-League Men and A-League Women. The zone is often divided into northern and southern sections for academy and junior competitions for ease of travel and other expenses.

The zone was renamed in 2021 from its predecessor − Football Brisbane − which was formed in 2007 with the amalgamation of a variety of Football associations. These being Brisbane Men's Football, Brisbane Women's Soccer Association, Brisbane North & Districts Junior Soccer Association Brisbane Southern Districts Junior Soccer Association and Soccer Australia Referees (Brisbane). Prior to the establishment of Football Queensland in 2007, Football in Brisbane acted as the highest level of football (soccer) in the state. Football Queensland Metro is descended from the Anglo-Queensland Football Association, formed in May 1884.

== The Football Queensland Metro Pyramids ==
=== Men's Pyramid ===
The Football Queensland Premier League − Metro competition is the fourth tier in the Football Queensland pyramid and the fifth tier in the Australian pyramid. Each respective competition has its own reserve league primarily for senior academy players.

Tier	Competition	Current Premiers	Current Champions
1	Football Queensland Premier League 3 − Metro (Premiers qualify for play-offs for promotion to FQPL 2, Bottom two teams relegated)	Albany Creek Excelsior	Bayside United
2	Football Queensland Premier League 4 − Metro (Top two teams promoted, bottom two relegated)	Pine Hills	Logan Metro
3	Football Queensland Premier League 5 − Metro (Top two teams promoted, bottom two relegated)	North Brisbane	North Brisbane
4	Football Queensland Premier League 6 − Metro (Top two teams promoted, no relegation)	Tarragindi Tigers	Tarragindi Tigers
5	Football Queensland Metro City Leagues (additional 8 divisions) (No promotion or relegation for any divisions) The City League Divisions are split into 'Blue', 'Gold' and 'Silver' by location within the region: Blue: Northern Teams; Gold: Southern Teams; Silver: Western Teams	Not Applicable	

=== Women's Pyramid ===
The Football Queensland Women's Premier League 3 − Metro competition is the fourth tier in the Football Queensland pyramid and the fifth tier in the Australian pyramid. Each respective competition has its own reserve league primarily for senior academy players.

Tier	Competition	Current Premiers	Current Champions
1	Football Queensland Women's Premier League 3 − Metro (Women's FQPL 3 − Metro) (Premiers qualify for play-offs for promotion to FQPL 2, Bottom two teams relegated)	Broadbeach United Women's	Broadbeach United Women's
2	Football Queensland Women's Metro City Leagues (additional 8 divisions) (No promotion or relegation for any divisions) The City League Divisions are split into 'Blue', 'Gold' and 'Silver' by location within the region: Blue: Northern Teams; Gold: Southern Teams; Silver: Western Teams	Not Applicable	

== Antecedent Governing Bodies ==
From	To	Organisation Name	Ref
1884	1889	Anglo-Queensland Football Association	
1890	1919	Queensland British Football Association	
1920	1927	Queensland Football Association	
1928	1939	Brisbane and District Football Association	
1940	1945	Queensland Soccer Football Association	
1946	1961	Brisbane and Ipswich Soccer Football Association	
1962	2002	Queensland Soccer Federation	
2003	2005	Brisbane Men's Soccer	
2006	2006	Brisbane Men's Football	
2007	2021	Football Brisbane	
2021−present		Football Queensland Metro	

== See also ==
- Football (soccer) in Australia
- Football (soccer) in Queensland
- History of association football in Brisbane, Queensland
