= 2026 Australia Cup preliminary rounds =

Qualification rounds for 2026 season of Australian soccer competition

Tournament details
- Country: Australia

The 2026 Australia Cup preliminary rounds was the qualifying competition to decide teams to take part in the 2026 Australia Cup. The competition commenced in January 2026 and concluded in June.

== Schedule ==
The fixtures for the competition are as follows.

Round	Number of fixtures	Clubs	ACT	NSW	NNSW	NT	QLD	SA	TAS	VIC	WA
Qualifying round	2 walkovers + 14 byes	777 → 775	—	—	—	—	31 Jan	—	—	—	—
First round	56 + 18 byes	775 → 719	—	—	–	—	31 Jan–7 Feb	—	—	13–16 Feb	—
Second round	158 + 41 byes	719 → 561	—	6–14 Mar	14 Feb–15 Mar	—	6–8 Feb	—	—	27 Feb–2 Mar	20–22 Feb
Third round	203 + 19 byes	561 → 358	24–26 Feb	12–31 Mar	21 Feb–25 Mar	—	13–15 Feb	20–28 Feb	7–9 Mar	13–16 Mar	13–15 Mar
Fourth round	172 + 1 bye	358 → 186	10 Mar–14 Apr	7–16 Apr	28 Feb–29 Apr	24 Mar–2 Apr	24 Mar–11 Apr	3–6 Apr	3–6 Apr	31 Mar–6 Apr	10–12 Apr
Fifth round	87 + 1 bye	186 → 99	28 Apr–5 May	21–29 Apr	7 Mar–13 May	30 Mar–7 Apr	21–29 Apr	24–27 Apr	24–26 Apr	28–29 Apr	1–2 May
Sixth round	44	99 → 55	20–21 May	5–13 May	6 Jun	2 May	12–31 May	12–20 May	15–17 May	12–13 May	19 May
Seventh round	22	55 → 33	6 Jun	26–28 May	10 Jun	21 May	12–13 Jun	10–17 Jun	8 Jun	26 May–2 Jun	16 Jun
Victorian play-off round	1	33 → 32	—	—	—	—	—	—	—	16 Jun	—

== Format ==
The preliminary rounds structures were as follows, and refer to the different levels in the unofficial Australian soccer league system:

- Qualifying round:

- 18 Queensland clubs from Regional Queensland level 5 and below entered this stage.

- First round:

- 16 Queensland clubs (2 from the previous round and 14 regional teams from level 5 and below) entered this stage.
- 102 Victorian clubs from level 7 and below entered this stage.

- Second round:

- 94 New South Wales clubs from the association clubs level (levels 5 and below) entered this stage.
- 30 Northern New South Wales clubs (from the south zone teams from levels 4 to 6) entered this stage.
- 102 Queensland clubs (8 from the previous round, 24 regional teams and 70 metro teams from level 5 and below) entered this stage.
- 112 Victorian clubs (51 from the previous round and 61 teams from levels 5 and 6) entered this stage.
- 16 Western Australian clubs from level 5 and below entered at this stage.

- Third round:

- 4 Australian Capital Territory clubs from level 3 and below entered this stage.
- 100 New South Wales clubs (47 from the previous round and 53 teams from levels 3 and 4) entered this stage.
- 42 Northern New South Wales clubs (15 from the previous round, 16 north zone teams, 11 south zone teams from levels and 4) entered this stage.
- 82 Queensland clubs (72 from the previous round, and 10 teams from levels 4) entered this stage.
- 58 South Australian clubs entered this stage, which doubled as the first stage of the 2026 FSA Federation Cup.
- 19 Tasmanian clubs entered this stage.
- 80 Victorian clubs (58 from the previous round and 22 teams from level 5) entered this stage.
- 42 Western Australian clubs (8 from the previous round and 34 teams from levels 3 and 4) entered this stage.

- Fourth round:

- 16 Australian Capital Territory clubs (2 from the previous round, 14 teams from levels 2 and 3) entered this stage.
- 64 New South Wales clubs (50 from the previous round and 14 teams from level 2) entered this stage.
- 32 Northern New South Wales clubs (21 from the previous round and 11 south zone teams from level 2) entered this stage.
- 11 Northern Territory clubs from level 2 and below entered this stage.
- 64 Queensland clubs (41 from the previous round and 23 teams from levels 2 and 3) entered this stage.
- 32 South Australian clubs progressed to this stage.
- 16 Tasmanian clubs progressed to this stage.
- 80 Victorian clubs (40 from the previous round and 40 teams from levels 2, 3 and 4) entered this stage.
- 32 Western Australian clubs (21 from the previous round and 11 teams from level 2) entered this stage.

- Fifth round:

- 8 Australian Capital Territory clubs progressed to this stage.
- 32 New South Wales clubs progressed to this stage.
- 16 Northern New South Wales clubs progressed to this stage.
- 8 Northern Territory clubs (2 from Alice Springs, 4 from the previous round and the winner of the 2025 NorZone Premier League) entered this stage.
- 32 Queensland clubs progressed to this stage.
- 40 Victorian clubs progressed to this stage.
- 16 South Australian clubs progressed to this stage.
- 8 Tasmanian clubs progressed to this stage.
- 16 Western Australian clubs progressed to this stage.

- Sixth round:

- 4 Australian Capital Territory clubs progressed to this stage.
- 16 New South Wales club progressed to this stage.
- 8 Northern New South Wales clubs progressed to this stage.
- 4 Northern Territory clubs progressed to this stage.
- 16 Queensland clubs progressed to this stage.
- 20 Victorian clubs progressed to this stage.
- 8 South Australian clubs progressed to this stage.
- 4 Tasmanian clubs progressed to this stage.
- 8 Western Australian clubs progressed to this stage.

- Seventh round:

- 2 Australian Capital Territory clubs progressed to this stage, which doubled as the Final of the Federation Cup.
- 8 New South Wales clubs progressed to this stage. The 4 winners also qualified for the final rounds of the Waratah Cup.
- 4 Northern New South Wales clubs progressed to this stage. The 2 winners also qualified for the Final of the NNSWF State Cup.
- 2 Northern Territory clubs progressed to this stage, which doubled as the Final of the NT Australia Cup.
- 8 Queensland clubs progressed to this stage; 1 from Regional Queensland, and 7 from South East Queensland. The 4 winners also qualified for the semi-finals of the Kappa Queensland Cup.
- 4 South Australian clubs progressed to this stage. The 2 winners also qualified for the final of the Federation Cup.
- 2 Tasmanian clubs progressed to this stage, which doubled as the Grand Final of the Milan Lakoseljac Cup.
- 10 Victorian clubs progressed to this stage. The 5 winners also qualified for the final rounds of the Dockerty Cup. Three of the winners progressed to the Round of 32, whilst two winners progressed to the play-off round.
- 4 Western Australian clubs progressed to this stage. The 2 winners also qualified for the Final of the Football West State Cup.

- Victorian play-off round:

- Two of the five Round 7 winners played-off for the last spot for the Round of 32.

== Key to abbreviations ==
Federation	Zone
ACT = Australian Capital Territory	
NSW = New South Wales	
NNSW = Northern New South Wales	NTH = North; STH = South
NT = Northern Territory	ASP = Alice Springs; DAR = Darwin
QLD = Queensland	CC = Central Coast; FNG = Far North and Gulf; NTH = Northern; REG = Regional Queensland (general); WB = Wide Bay; WC = Whitsunday Coast
QLD = Queensland	SEQ = South East Queensland
SA = South Australia	
TAS = Tasmania	
VIC = Victoria	
WA = Western Australia	

== Qualifying round ==
Fed.	Zone	Tie no	Home team (Tier)	Score	Away team (Tier)
Queensland
QLD	CC	1	Southside United (6)	w/o	Clinton FC (5)
QLD	WB	2	Doon Villa (5)	w/o	Bargara FC (5)

Notes:

- w/o = Walkover
- QLD Byes: Across The Waves (5), Berserker Bears (5), Bingera FC (5), Boyne Tannum FC (5), Bluebirds United (5), Brothers Aston Villa (5), Capricorn Coast FC (5), Central FC (5), SC Corinthians (5), Frenchville SC (5), Nerimbera FC (5), Sunbury Blues (5), United Park Eagles (5), United Warriors (5).

== First round ==
Fed.	Zone	Tie no	Home team (Tier)	Score	Away team (Tier)
Queensland
QLD	CC	1	Nerimbera FC (5)	5–1	Capricorn Coast(5)
QLD	CC	2	Bluebirds United (5)	2–16	Frenchville FC (5)
QLD	CC	3	Central FC (5)	8–0	Boyne Tannum (5)
QLD	CC	4	Clinton FC (5)	3–1	Berserker Bears (5)
QLD	WB	5	United Warriors (5)	1–2	Bingera FC (5)
QLD	WB	6	SC Corinthians (5)	4–0	Brothers Aston Villa (5)
QLD	WB	7	Bargara FC (5)	0–10	Sunbury Blues (5)
QLD	WB	8	Across The Waves (5)	2–1	United Park Eagles (5)
Victoria
VIC	–	9	Melbourne University (8)	3–3†	Brighton SC (10)
Brighton advance 5–3 on penalties
VIC	–	10	St Albans Gospic Bears (13)	w/o	Heidelberg Stars (9)
VIC	–	11	Fortuna '60 (9)	w/o	Melton Phoenix (8)
VIC	–	12	Newport Storm (9)	w/o	Rosebud FC (8)
VIC	–	13	West Preston (8)	1–0†	Keilor Wolves (9)
VIC	–	14	Barwon FC (10)	1–2	Doreen United (9)
VIC	–	15	Lilydale Montrose United (11)	w/o	Point Cook (8)
VIC	–	16	Bendigo City (9)	w/o	Bunyip & District (10)
VIC	–	17	Pakenham United (10)	0–2	Casey Panthers (10)
VIC	–	18	Ocean Grove (10)	4–0	Old Melburnians (10)
Ocean Grove tie reversed from original draw
VIC	–	19	Croydon Ranges (11)	1–8	Seaford United (9)
VIC	–	20	Baxter FC (8)	5–1	Bacchus Marsh (12)
VIC	–	21	Spring Gully United (12)	2–0	Thornbury Athletic (9)
VIC	–	22	Yarra Jets (9)	6–1	Spring Hills (10)
VIC	–	23	ETA Buffalo Club (11)	w/o	Greenvale United (11)
VIC	–	24	FC Eaglehawk (12)	3–5	Ballarat North United (12)
VIC	–	25	Chelsea FC (8)	2–0	Monbulk Rangers (9)
VIC	–	26	Lyndale United (9)	1–3	Whitehorse United (10)
VIC	–	27	Boronia FC (11)	1–3	Darebin United (9)

Fed.	Zone	Tie no	Home team (Tier)	Score	Away team (Tier)
VIC	–	28	Noble Suns (11)	w/o	Ringwood City (8)
VIC	–	29	Shepparton United (12)	3–1	Melbourne City (9)
VIC	–	30	Somerville Eagles (9)	w/o	Wyndham FC (11)
VIC	–	31	Westside Strikers Caroline Springs (8)	1–0	Mount Eliza (10)
VIC	–	32	East Bentleigh (9)	5–3†	Aspendale FC (11)
VIC	–	33	Glen Eira (12)	1–0	Golden City (12)
VIC	–	34	Mount Martha (11)	0–6	Kings Domain (8)
VIC	–	35	Moonee Valley Knights (9)	2–1	Ballarat SC (12)
VIC	–	36	Mentone FC (10)	0–10	Sebastopol Vikings (8)
VIC	–	37	Alphington FC (10)	5–1	West Point (10)
VIC	–	38	Truganina Hornets (10)	1–0	Keysborough SC (11)
VIC	–	39	Mount Waverley City (9)	3–0	La Trobe University (11)
VIC	–	40	Meadow Park (9)	6–2	Strathdale FC (12)
VIC	–	41	Watsonia Heights (8)	9–0	Swinburne FC (13)
VIC	–	42	Gisborne FC (11)	2–2†	FC Birrarung (11)
Gisborne advance 5–4 on penalties
VIC	–	43	Springvale City (8)	w/o	Cleeland United (11)
VIC	–	44	Maidstone United (10)	2–0	Endeavour Hills Fire (11)
VIC	–	45	Keon Park (8)	6–2	Templestowe Wolves (9)
VIC	–	46	Keysborough District (11)	3–2	Castlemaine Goldfields (13)
VIC	–	47	Mitchell Rangers (11)	0–9	Hume Bulls (10)
Mitchell Rangers tie reversed from original draw
VIC	–	48	Monash City Villarreal (9)	4–1	Noble Hurricanes (9)
VIC	–	49	Moonee Ponds United (8)	5–0	Glenroy Lions (10)
VIC	–	50	Bell Park (8)	0–3	Ashburton United (8)
VIC	–	51	Old Ivanhoe (10)	3–1	Burwood City (11)
VIC	–	52	Frankston Pines (10)	w/o	Old Trinity Grammarians (11)
VIC	–	53	Glen Waverley (11)	w/o	Greater Dandenong (8)
VIC	–	54	Moreland Eagles (10)	6–0	Knox United (10)
VIC	–	55	Sandown Lions (9)	1–2	Riversdale FC (8)
VIC	–	56	East Kew (8)	11–0	Latrobe University Bendigo (12)

Notes:

- w/o = Walkover
- † = After Extra Time
- Vic Byes: Albert Park (8), Barnstoneworth United (8), Deakin University Ducks (9), Docklands Athletic (10), Dynamo Melbourne (11), Fitzroy Lions (12), Footscray Rangers (11), Lara United (9), Laverton FC (8), Monash University (8), Murray United (11), Old St Kevins (10), Phillip Island (12), Reservoir United (16), Roxburgh Park United (11), Sale United (12), Truganina Lions (12), Warrnambool Rangers (12).

== Second round ==
Fed.	Zone	Tie no	Home team (Tier)	Score	Away team (Tier)
New South Wales
NSW	–	1	Oran Park Rovers (5)	2–1	ACU Sport (5)
NSW	–	2	Shoalhaven FC (6)	1–3	Coogee United (5)
NSW	–	3	Belmore Eagles (5)	3–4	University of Wollongong (6)
NSW	–	4	The Ponds (5)	w/o	Marulan FC (5)
NSW	–	5	Corrimal Rangers (7)	0–20	Waverley Old Boys (5)
NSW	–	6	West Ryde Rovers (5)	0–2	Parklea SFC (6)
NSW	–	7	Cringila Lions (5)	11–0	Asquith FC (6)
NSW	–	8	Figtree FC (7)	1–3	Newbury Bulls (5)
NSW	–	9	St.Michael's Lane Cove (6)	0–11	Southern & Ettalong Utd (5)
NSW	–	10	Tahmoor SC (5)	3–2†	Glenmore Park (5)
NSW	–	11	Arncliffe Aurora (5)	3–0	Eastern Creek Pioneer (5)
NSW	–	12	Northbridge FC (5)	2–3	Fairfield Patrician Brothers (5)
NSW	–	13	Forest Rangers (5)	1–3	Hurlstone Park Wanderers (5)
NSW	–	14	Blacktown Workers (5)	3–2†	Kellyville Kolts (5)
NSW	–	15	Dubbo Macquarie Utd (5)	0–5	Marayong FC (5)
NSW	–	16	Colo SFC (5)	0–4	Dolls Point (5)
NSW	–	17	Springwood United (5)	0–10	Wollongong United (5)
NSW	–	18	East Bankstown (5)	w/o	Berkeley Vale (5)
NSW	–	19	Shellharbour City (7)	1–0	Fairfield Eagles (6)
NSW	–	20	Narrabeen FC (5)	8–0	Austral SC (6)
NSW	–	21	St.Georges Basin (5)	6–5†	Quakers Hill (5)
NSW	–	22	Carss Park (6)	1–2	San Souci (5)
NSW	–	23	Coledale Waves (7)	2–5	Hurstville Glory (5)
NSW	–	24	Glebe Gorillas (5)	9–0	Emu Plains (5)
NSW	–	25	Kemps Creek United (5)	1–6	All Saints Oatley West (6)
NSW	–	26	Sylvania Heights (5)	0–8	Wollongong Olympic (5)
NSW	–	27	Phoenix FC (5)	5–0	Unanderra Hearts (6)
NSW	–	28	North Sydney United (5)	5–2	Fernhill FC (6)
NSW	–	29	Eschol Park (5)	0–3	Toukley Gorokan (6)
NSW	–	30	Peakhurst United (5)	7–1	Sydney Rangers (6)
NSW	–	31	Strathfield FC (5)	13–0	Roselea FC (6)
NSW	–	32	Mt Annan Mustangs (5)	4–4†	Umina United (5)
Mt Annan Mustangs advance 3–2 on penalties
NSW	–	33	Sydney CBD (6)	3–0	Marrickville FC (5)
NSW	–	34	Terrigal United (5)	7–0	Doonside Hawks (5)
NSW	–	35	Kariong United (6)	0–5	Randwick City (5)
NSW	–	36	Carlton Rovers (6)	1–4	Moorebank Sports (5)
NSW	–	37	Earlwood Wanderers (7)	7–0	Shoalhaven Heads Berry (5)
NSW	–	38	Western Condors (5)	0–2	Lilli Pilli (5)
NSW	–	39	White City (5)	3–2	Homenetmen Antranig (5)
NSW	–	40	Banksia Tigers (5)	2–0	St Mary's Eagle Vale (5)
NSW	–	41	Gunners FC (5)	4–1	Box Hill Rangers (5)
NSW	–	42	Gymea United (5)	1–4	Coniston FC (5)
NSW	–	43	Hornsby Heights (5)	0–3	Maroubra Utd (6)
NSW	–	44	Yagoona Lions (5)	0–5	Fairfield Bulls (5)
NSW	–	45	Lindfield FC (5)	4–2	Hills Spirit (5)
NSW	–	46	Balmain and Districts (5)	0–12	Shellharbour FC (5)
NSW	–	47	Narellan Rangers (5)	w/o	Port Pumas (8)
Northern NSW
NNSW	NTH	48	Southern United (5)	w/o	Casino RSM Cobras (4)
NNSW	STH	49	Bellbird Junior (-)	0–4	Mayfield United Senior (4)
NNSW	STH	50	Minmi FC (5)	7–0	Barnsley United (6)
NNSW	STH	51	Fletcher FC (6)	0–5	Kurri Kurri (6)
NNSW	STH	52	Greta Branxton (5)	2–2†	Muswellbrook Eagles (6)
Muswellbrook Eagles advance 3–2 on penalties
NNSW	STH	53	Newcastle Suns (4)	7–0	Rutherford FC (6)
NNSW	STH	54	Charlestown Junior (6)	2–1	Nelson Bay (5)
NNSW	STH	55	Westlakes Wildcats (4)	2–2†	Stockton Sharks (4)
Stockton Sharks advance 5–3 on penalties
NNSW	STH	56	Thornton Redbacks (4)	1–3	Kotara South (4)
NNSW	STH	57	Northumberland FC (4)	5–1	Cardiff City (4)
NNSW	STH	58	Lambton Jaffas Juniors (5)	2–1	North United Wolves (5)
NNSW	STH	59	Bolwarra Lorn Junior (5)	2–0	Garden Suburb (6)
NNSW	STH	60	Southern Lakes United (6)	2–2†	Merewether United (6)
Southern Lakes United advance 5–4 on penalties
NNSW	STH	61	Warners Bay (4)	1–0	Maitland Junior (6)
NNSW	STH	62	University of Newcastle (4)	3–0	South Maitland (5)
Queensland
QLD	CC	63	Nerimbera FC (5)	0–3	Central FC (5)
QLD	CC	64	Frenchville FC (5)	1–1†	Clinton FC (5)
Clinton advance 7–6 on penalties
QLD	FNG	65	Innisfail United (5)	8–0	Stratford Dolphins (5)
QLD	FNG	66	Redlynch Strikers United (5)	2–0	Mareeba United (5)
QLD	FNG	67	Edge Hill United (5)	1–2	Marlin Coast Rangers (5)
QLD	FNG	68	Southside Comets (5)	0–2	Leichhardt FC (5)
QLD	NTH	69	Townsville Warriors (5)	0–3	Riverway JCU (5)
QLD	NTH	70	Saints Eagles Souths (5)	2–3	Burdekin FC (5)
QLD	NTH	71	Brothers Townsville (5)	5–0	Rebels FC (5)
QLD	NTH	72	Estates FC (5)	2–7	MA Olympic (5)
QLD	WB	73	Sunbury Blues (5)	4–0	Across the Waves (5)
QLD	WB	74	Bingera FC (5)	1–2	SC Corinthians (5)
QLD	WC	75	Mackay Wanderers (5)	0–3	Mackay Lions (5)
QLD	WC	76	Magpies FC (5)	0–0†	Mackay Rangers (5)
Magpies FC advance 5–3 on penalties
QLD	WC	77	Whitsunday United (5)	3–4	City Brothers (5)
QLD	WC	78	Dolphins FC (5)	w/o	Country United (6)
QLD	SEQ	79	Springfield United (5)	4–4†	Runaway Bay (5)
Runaway Bay advance 4–3 on penalties

Fed.	Zone	Tie no	Home team (Tier)	Score	Away team (Tier)
QLD	SEQ	80	Tarragindi Tigers (7)	1–8	Ipswich Knights (5)
QLD	SEQ	81	Woombye FC (5)	2–3	AC Carina (5)
QLD	SEQ	82	Moggill FC (5)	8–1	Kangaroo Point Rovers (6)
QLD	SEQ	83	North Brisbane (5)	4–1	Coolum FC (5)
QLD	SEQ	84	Pacific Pines (5)	2–1†	Tweed United (5)
QLD	SEQ	85	Brighton Bulldogs (8)	1–5	Bethania Rams (7)
QLD	SEQ	86	Redcliffe Dolphins (5)	4–1	Centenary Stormers (6)
QLD	SEQ	87	Ridge Hills United (7)	2–0†	Annerley FC (6)
QLD	SEQ	88	Highfields FC (5)	1–3	Willowburn FC (5)
QLD	SEQ	89	Acacia Ridge (7)	1–0†	Gatton Redbacks (5)
QLD	SEQ	90	Nambour Yandina (5)	8–0	St. Albans (5)
QLD	SEQ	91	Beerwah Glasshouse United (5)	1–4	Palm Beach (5)
QLD	SEQ	92	North Pine (5)	1–2†	Logan Village (6)
QLD	SEQ	93	Bardon Latrobe (6)	0–1	Ripley Valley (6)
Victoria
VIC	–	94	Elwood City (7)	1–2	Dallas City (7)
VIC	–	95	Keysborough District (11)	0–2	Sandringham SC (7)
VIC	–	96	Maidstone United (10)	1–6	Keon Park (8)
VIC	–	97	Sebastopol Vikings (8)	0–2	Casey Comets (6)
VIC	–	98	Moonee Ponds United (8)	1–0	Croydon City (7)
VIC	–	99	Westside Strikers Caroline Springs (8)	w/o	Greater Dandenong (8)
VIC	–	100	Mount Waverley City (9)	0–1	Warrnambool Rangers (12)
VIC	–	101	Old St Kevins (10)	2–1	Docklands Athletic (10)
VIC	–	102	Dynamo Melbourne (11)	1–1†	Doreen United (9)
Doreen United advance 4–3 on penalties
VIC	–	103	Monash University (8)	2–3	Kings Domain (8)
VIC	–	104	Somerville Eagles (9)	0–2	Yarra Jets (9)
VIC	–	105	Albion Rovers (6)	2–1	Endeavour United (7)
VIC	–	106	Heidelberg Eagles (7)	0–5	Riversdale SC (8)
VIC	–	107	Plenty Valley Lions (7)	w/o	Ocean Grove (10)
VIC	–	108	Berwick City (6)	2–0	Waverley City Wanderers (6)
VIC	–	109	Hampton Park United Sparrows (7)	5–4†	Chelsea FC (8)
VIC	–	110	Deakin University Ducks (9)	1–0	Manningham Juventus (7)
VIC	–	111	Mill Park (6)	1–0	Geelong Rangers (6)
VIC	–	112	Greenvale United (11)	w/o	Whitehorse United (10)
VIC	–	113	Casey Panthers (10)	w/o	Phillip Island (12)
VIC	–	114	Epping City (7)	5–0	Middle Park (7)
VIC	–	115	White Star Dandenong (7)	1–6	Brimbank Stallions (6)
VIC	–	116	Gisborne SC (11)	1–3	Barnstonewoth United (8)
VIC	–	117	Lara United (9)	0–4	Hume Bulls (10)
VIC	–	118	St Albans Gospic Bears (13)	0–6	Roxburgh Park United (11)
VIC	–	119	Old Ivanhoe (10)	10–0	Truganina Lions (12)
VIC	–	120	Diamond Valley United (7)	2–1	Alphington FC (10)
VIC	–	121	Point Cook (8)	6–2†	Knox City (6)
VIC	–	122	Watsonia Heights (8)	1–3	West Preston (8)
VIC	–	123	Strathmore Split (6)	2–1	Darebin United (9)
VIC	–	124	Balmoral FC (7)	4–0	Fitzroy Lions (12)
VIC	–	125	Newport Storm (9)	1–8	Uni Hill Eagles (6)
VIC	–	126	Heatherton United (7)	8–2	Monash City Villarreal (9)
VIC	–	127	Sunbury United (7)	4–0	Laverton FC (8)
VIC	–	128	Seaford United (9)	2–0	East Bentleigh (9)
VIC	–	129	Meadow Park (9)	2–0	Footscray Rangers (11)
VIC	–	130	Springvale City (8)	1–4	Mooroolbark SC (6)
VIC	–	131	Bendigo City (9)	4–4†	Altona North (6)
Bendigo City advance 4–3 on penalties
VIC	–	132	Western Eagles (6)	2–1	Dandenong South (6)
VIC	–	133	Bundoora United (7)	3–0	Ashburton United (8)
VIC	–	134	Hoppers Crossing (7)	1–4	Corio SC (6)
VIC	–	135	Peninsula Strikers (6)	w/o	Baxter FC (8)
VIC	–	136	Albert Park (8)	w/o	Brighton SC (10)
VIC	–	137	Fawkner SC (7)	1–0	Gippsland United (6)
VIC	–	138	Rowville Eagles (7)	1–3	Williamstown SC (6)
VIC	–	139	Surf Coast (6)	2–0	Noble Park United (6)
VIC	–	140	Spring Gully United (12)	0–3	Moreland Eagles (10)
VIC	–	141	Brunswick Zebras (7)	3–0	East Kew (8)
VIC	–	142	Sale United (12)	2–0	Frankston Pines (10)
VIC	–	143	Ringwood City (8)	3–0	Chisholm United (6)
VIC	–	144	Whittlesea Ranges (6)	0–3	Craigieburn City (7)
VIC	–	145	Bentleigh United Cobras (7)	1–0	Truganina Hornets (10)
VIC	–	146	Glen Eira (12)	0–6	Melton Phoenix (8)
VIC	–	147	North Caulfield Maccabi (6)	w/o	Reservoir United (16)
VIC	–	148	Shepparton United (12)	3–0	Brandon Park (6)
VIC	–	149	Murray United (11)	1–0	Doncaster Rovers (7)
VIC	–	150	Ballarat North United (12)	1–3	Moonee Valley Knights (9)
Western Australia
WA	–	151	Spearwood Dalmatinac (8)	w/o	Twin City Saints (-)
WA	–	152	Cracovia SC (6)	2–0	Mindarie FC (-)
WA	–	153	Joondanna Blues (7)	0–1	Wanneroo City (4)
WA	–	154	Dunsborough Town (-)	0–0	Swan United (4)
Dunsborough Town advance 5–4 on penalties
WA	–	155	Ellenbrook United (6)	w/o	Football Margaret River (-)
WA	–	156	Dalyellup Park Rangers (-)	1–2	Kwinana United (6)
WA	–	157	Bunbury Dynamos (-)	5–3	Stirling Panthers (-)
WA	–	158	North Perth United (5)	1–2	Port Kennedy (6)

Notes

- w/o = Walkover
- † = After Extra Time
- QLD Byes: Australian Catholic University (8), Baringa (5), Bilambil Terranora (7), Bribie Island (8), Burleigh Heads (5), Caloundra FC (4), Coomera FC (5), Gympie United (5), Jimboomba United (7), Kawana FC (5), Kingscliff (5), Logan Metro (6), Logan Roos (5), Maroochydore Swans (5), Mooroondu (7), Mount Gravatt Hawks (5), Mudgeeraba (5), Musgrave FC (5), Nerang (6), New Farm United (6), Newmarket (5), Noosa Lions (5), North Lakes United (5), Ormeau FC (5), Oxley United (8), Pimpama FC (6), Pine Rivers United (7), QUT FC (7), Rockville Rovers (5), Slacks Creek (7), Stanthorpe Carlton United (6), Surfers Paradise Apollo (5), Tamborine Mountain (7), The Gap (6), Uni of Southern Queensland (5), University of Queensland (5), Warwick FC (5), West Wanderers (5), Western Spirit (6), Westside FC (7), Yeronga Eagles (5).

== Third round ==
Fed.	Zone	Tie no	Home team (Tier)	Score	Away team (Tier)
Australian Capital Territory
ACT	–	1	Narrabundah FC (-)	5–0	Belwest SC (-)
ACT	–	2	ANU FC (3)	1–0	Woden Valley (-)
New South Wales
NSW	–	3	Peakhurst United (5)	0–4	Bulli FC (5)
NSW	–	4	Banksia Tigers (5)	4–1	Leichhardt Saints (7)
NSW	–	5	Holroyd Rangers (5)	3–4	Fairfield Patrician Brothers (5)
NSW	–	6	Lindfield FC (5)	0–3	Lane Cove (6)
NSW	–	7	Blacktown Spartans (3)	4–3	San Souci (5)
NSW	–	8	Winston Hills (5)	0–1	Toukley Gorokan (6)
NSW	–	9	Albion Park White Eagles (5)	7–0	Gosford City (5)
NSW	–	10	Sydney University (4)	3–1	Tarrawanna Blueys (5)
NSW	–	11	Gladesville Ryde Magic (4)	4–1	All Saints Oatley West (6)
NSW	–	12	Strathfield FC (5)	2–1	Western City Rangers (3)
NSW	–	13	St.Georges Basin (5)	1–9	Randwick City (5)
NSW	–	14	Inner West Hawks (4)	5–2†	Inter Lions (3)
NSW	–	15	Parramatta FC (4)	2–2†	Gunners FC (5)
Gunners FC advance 3–2 on penalties
NSW	–	16	Lilli Pilli (5)	0–2	Marayong FC (5)
NSW	–	17	Hurstville Glory (5)	3–3†	Macarthur Rams (3)
Macarthur Rams advance 4–1 on penalties
NSW	–	18	Fairfield Bulls (5)	2–0	East Bankstown (5)
NSW	–	19	Moorebank Sports (5)	3–0	Hurlstone Park Wanderers (5)
NSW	–	20	Highlands FC (7)	4–0	Blaxland FC (6)
NSW	–	21	Albion Park FC (7)	0–10	Shellharbour FC (5)
NSW	–	22	Waverley Old Boys (5)	2–4	Southern & Ettalong Utd (5)
NSW	–	23	Central Coast United (4)	3–1	Arncliffe Aurora (5)
NSW	–	24	Cringila Lions (5)	3–2	Narellan Rangers (5)
NSW	–	25	Bankstown City (3)	6–0	FC Bossy Liverpool (5)
NSW	–	26	Lowland Wanderers (5)	0–2	Coniston FC (5)
NSW	–	27	Narrabeen FC (5)	5–2	Blacktown Workers (5)
NSW	–	28	Enfield Rovers (5)	1–4	Phoenix FC (5)
NSW	–	29	Hakoah Sydney City East (3)	5–3	Mosman FC (5)
NSW	–	30	Tahmoor SC (5)	0–3	Hawkesbury City (4)
NSW	–	31	Dunbar Rovers (4)	3–2†	Wollongong Olympic (5)
NSW	–	32	Parklea FC (6)	1–3	The Ponds (5)
NSW	–	33	Gregory Hills (5)	0–5	Terrigal United (5)
NSW	–	34	Wollongong United (5)	2–1†	Forest Killarney (5)
NSW	–	35	Newbury Bulls (5)	0–2	Sydney CBD FC (6)
NSW	–	36	Como Jannali (5)	5–0	North Sydney United (5)
NSW	–	37	Bonnyrigg White Eagles (4)	2–1	Coogee United (5)
NSW	–	38	Fraser Park (4)	3–0	University of Wollongong (6)
NSW	–	39	Camden Tigers (4)	6–0	Picton Rangers (6)
NSW	–	40	Prospect United (4)	2–3†	Nepean FC (4)
NSW	–	41	Pendle Hill (5)	3–1	Kincumber Roos (6)
NSW	–	42	Lithgow Workmens Senior (5)	0–3	Hurstville Zagreb (3)
NSW	–	43	Dolls Point (5)	8–1	Oran Park Rovers (5)
NSW	–	44	Maroubra United (6)	1–2†	Canterbury Bankstown (3)
NSW	–	45	Putney Rangers (5)	1–12	Dulwich Hill (3)
NSW	–	46	White City (5)	0–9	Northern Tigers (3)
NSW	–	47	Glebe Gorillas (5)	8–2	Castle Hill Rockets RSL (6)
NSW	–	48	Mt Annan Mustangs (5)	4–1	Shellharbour City (7)
NSW	–	49	Hills United (3)	4–0	South Coast Flame (4)
NSW	–	50	Connells Point Rovers (5)	0–6	Mounties Wanderers (3)
NSW	–	51	Earlwood Wanderers (7)	2–0	Rydalmere Lions (3)
NSW	–	52	Granville Rage (4)	0–1	Bankstown United (4)
Northern NSW
NNSW	NTH	53	Moore Creek (4)	6–3	Lake Cathie (4)
NNSW	NTH	54	Pottsville Beach (5)	3–1	Inverell FC (4)
NNSW	NTH	55	North Companions (4)	2–3	Demon Knights (4)
NNSW	NTH	56	Westlawn Tigers (6)	1–2	Southern United (5)
NNSW	NTH	57	Coffs City United (4)	2–2†	Yamba FC (4)
Coffs City United advance 4–3 on penalties
NNSW	NTH	58	Boambee FC (6)	w/o	Northern Storm (4)
NNSW	NTH	59	East Armidale United (4)	2–8	Oxley Vale Attunga (4)
NNSW	NTH	60	Tamworth FC (4)	4–0	Armidale City Westside (4)
NNSW	STH	61	Mayfield United (4)	3–2	Newcatle Croatia (3)
NNSW	STH	62	Muswellbrook Eagles (6)	2–7	University of Newcastle (4)
NNSW	STH	63	Minmi FC (5)	4–1	Stockton Sharks (4)
NNSW	STH	64	Southern Lakes United (6)	2–3	Cessnock City Hornets (3)
NNSW	STH	65	Kotara South (4)	4–1	Lake Macquarie City (3)
NNSW	STH	66	Kurri Kurri (6)	0–3	Warners Bay (4)
NNSW	STH	67	Newcastle Suns (4)	4–2	Lambton Jaffas (5)
NNSW	STH	68	New Lambton (3)	6–2	Northumberland United (4)
NNSW	STH	69	Toronto Awaba (3)	4–2	Singleton Strikers (3)
NNSW	STH	70	South Cardiff (3)	2–3	Dudley Redhead United (3)
NNSW	STH	71	West Wallsend (3)	3–0	Charlestown JFC (6)
NNSW	STH	72	Wallsend (3)	2–0	Bolwarra Lorn (5)
Queensland
QLD	CC	73	Clinton FC (5)	1–1†	Central FC (5)
Clinton FC advance 3–2 on penalties
QLD	FNG	74	Marlin Coast Rangers (5)	6–3	Innisfail United (5)
QLD	FNG	75	Redlynch Strikers United (5)	1–2	Leichhardt FC (5)
QLD	NTH	76	Riverway JCU (5)	3–5	MA Olympic (5)
QLD	NTH	77	Brothers Townsville (5)	7–1	Burdekin FC (5)
QLD	WB	78	SC Corinthians (5)	2–2†	Sunbury Blues (5)
SC Corinthians advance 3–0 on penalties
QLD	WC	79	Magpies FC (5)	7–1	Dolphins FC (5)
QLD	WC	80	City Brothers (5)	0–2	Mackay Lions (5)
QLD	SEQ	81	Coomera FC (5)	5–4	UQFC (5)
QLD	SEQ	82	Rockville Rovers (5)	0–2	SWQ Thunder (4)
QLD	SEQ	83	West Wanderers (5)	0–4	Newmarket (5)
QLD	SEQ	84	Souths United (4)	2–3	New Farm United (6)
QLD	SEQ	85	Grange Thistle (4)	8–0	QUT FC (7)
QLD	SEQ	86	Palm Beach (5)	10–0	Logan Roos (5)
QLD	SEQ	87	Nambour Yandina United (5)	5–2†	Ridge Hills United (7)
QLD	SEQ	88	AC Carina (5)	9–0	Bribie Island (8)
QLD	SEQ	89	Noosa Lions (5)	w/o	Logan Village (6)
QLD	SEQ	90	Kawana FC (5)	3–0	Slacks Creek (7)
QLD	SEQ	91	Samford Rangers (4)	w/o	Tamborine Mountain Eagles (7)
QLD	SEQ	92	Yeronga Eagles (5)	3–3†	Ormeau FC (5)
Yeronga Eagles advance 4–3 on penalties
QLD	SEQ	93	Redcliffe Dolphins (5)	3–5	Ripley Valley (6)
QLD	SEQ	94	Westside Grovely (7)	1–3	Mooroondu FC (7)
QLD	SEQ	95	Acacia Ridge (7)	0–2	Maroochydore Swans (5)
QLD	SEQ	96	Pine Rivers FC (7)	6–2	Gympie United (5)
QLD	SEQ	97	Oxley United (8)	0–6	Ipswich Knights (5)
QLD	SEQ	98	Moggill (5)	4–3	North Brisbane (5)
QLD	SEQ	99	Western Spirit (6)	5–1	Warwick Wolves (5)
QLD	SEQ	100	Nerang (6)	11–1	Stanthorpe Carlton United (6)
QLD	SEQ	101	Kingscliff Wolves (5)	4–0	Pine Hills (4)
QLD	SEQ	102	The Gap (6)	1–3	Taringa Rovers (4)

Fed.	Zone	Tie no	Home team (Tier)	Score	Away team (Tier)
QLD	SEQ	103	Baringa FC (5)	0–4	Logan Metro (6)
QLD	SEQ	104	Runaway Bay (5)	2–2†	Mitchelton FC (4)
Mitchelton advance 5–4 on penalties
QLD	SEQ	105	Virginia United (4)	7–0	Australian Catholic University (8)
QLD	SEQ	106	Southside Eagles (4)	2–1	Surfers Paradise Apollo (5)
QLD	SEQ	107	Caloundra FC (4)	4–1	Pacific Pines (5)
QLD	SEQ	108	Burleigh Heads (5)	5–1	Bethania Rams (7)
QLD	SEQ	109	Uni SQ (5)	1–4	Brisbane Knights (4)
QLD	SEQ	110	Pimpama FC (6)	1–6	Musgrave FC (5)
QLD	SEQ	111	Jimboomba United (7)	0–8	Mudgeeraba (5)
QLD	SEQ	112	Willowburn FC (5)	1–2	North Lakes United (5)
QLD	SEQ	113	Bilambil Terranora (7)	0–6	Mount Gravatt Hawks (5)
South Australia
SA	–	114	Elizabeth Grove (4)	2–6	Modbury Jets (3)
SA	–	115	Port Adelaide (4)	3–1	Sturt Marion Thunder (-)
SA	–	116	Croydon FC (2)	10–2	Plympton Bulldogs (4)
SA	–	117	MA Hawks (-)	1–11	Eastern United (3)
SA	–	118	Vipers FC (4)	1–2	Salisbury Inter (4)
SA	–	119	Elizabeth Downs (4)	0–4	Playford City (2)
SA	–	120	Adelaide Omonia Cobras (3)	3–0	Ingle Farm (-)
SA	–	121	Adelaide City (2)	3–0	Seaford Rangers (4)
SA	–	122	Old Ignatians (-)	0–3	Salisbury United (3)
SA	–	123	Blue Lake (5)	0–2	Gawler Eagles (4)
SA	–	124	Whyalla Lions (5)	3–1	Naracoorte United (5)
SA	–	125	Gambier Centrals (5)	0–8	Adelaide Olympic (3)
SA	–	126	Mount Barker United (4)	4–2†	Angle Vale (4)
SA	–	127	The Cove (3)	1–4	Fulham United (3)
SA	–	128	Pontian Eagles (4)	2–1	West Adelaide Raptors (-)
SA	–	129	Modbury Vista (4)	2–5	Adelaide Comets (2)
SA	–	130	Adelaide Titans (4)	0–1	FK Beograd (2)
SA	–	131	International SC (5)	0–1	Adelaide Croatia Raiders (3)
SA	–	132	Adelaide University (4)	4–2	Adelaide Brasfoot (-)
SA	–	133	Para Hills West (-)	3–3†	Adelaide Blue Eagles (3)
Para Hills West advance 5–4 on penalties
SA	–	134	Para Hills East (-)	2–0	South Adelaide Panthers (3)
SA	–	135	Tea Tree Gully (-)	3–2	Adelaide Hills Hawks (4)
SA	–	136	Noarlunga United (4)	3–1	Ghan United (4)
SA	–	137	Barossa United (4)	1–3	Western Strikers (4)
SA	–	138	BOSA FC (-)	0–6	Adelaide Atletico (3)
SA	–	139	Cumberland United (3)	4–2	Northern Demons (4)
Tasmania
TAS	–	140	New Town Eagles (3)	1–3	Olympia FC Warriors (3)
TAS	–	141	Barnstoneworth United (5)	4–3	Hobart United (3)
TAS	–	142	Hobart City (3)	3–2	University of Tasmania (3)
Victoria
VIC	–	143	Whitehorse United (10)	0–7	Bentleigh United Cobras (7)
VIC	–	144	Riversdale SC (8)	9–1	Roxburgh Park United (11)
VIC	–	145	Keon Park (8)	0–4	Doveton SC (5)
VIC	–	146	Mooroolbark SC (6)	1–2	Altona East Phoenix (5)
VIC	–	147	Sunbury United (7)	3–1	FC Strathmore Split (6)
VIC	–	148	Craigieburn City (7)	4–3	Boroondara-Carey Eagles (5)
VIC	–	149	Warrnambool Rangers (12)	1–6	Mill Park (6)
VIC	–	150	Sale United (12)	1–4†	Kings Domain (8)
VIC	–	151	Geelong SC (5)	3–3†	Lalor United (5)
Lalor United advance 5–4 on penalties
VIC	–	152	Berwick City (6)	0–1	Hampton East Brighton (5)
VIC	–	153	Surf Coast (6)	3–0	Old St Kevins (10)
VIC	–	154	Shepparton United (12)	2–6	Uni Hill Eagles (6)
VIC	–	155	Doreen United (9)	0–1	Moreland Eagles (10)
VIC	–	156	Fawkner SC (7)	3–0	Diamond Valley United (7)
VIC	–	157	Dallas City (7)	3–2	Brighton SC (10)
VIC	–	158	Brunswick Zebras (7)	6–0	Meadow Park (9)
VIC	–	159	Westside Strikers Caroline Springs (8)	1–2	Epping City (7)
VIC	–	160	Baxter FC (8)	1–3	Skye United (5)
VIC	–	161	Beaumaris SC (5)	4–0	Hume Bulls (10)
VIC	–	162	Seaford United (9)	2–4	Collingwood City (5)
VIC	–	163	Melton Phoenix (8)	0–2	Albion Rovers (6)
VIC	–	164	Yarraville Glory (5)	1–0	Point Cook (8)
VIC	–	165	Heatherton United (7)	4–2	Upfield SC (5)
VIC	–	166	Casey Comets (6)	0–2	Old Scotch (5)
VIC	–	167	Pascoe Vale (5)	3–0	North Caulfield Maccabi (6)
VIC	–	168	South Springvale (5)	6–0	West Preston (8)
VIC	–	169	FCClifton Hill (5)	1–2†	Western Eagles (6)
VIC	–	170	Ballarat City (5)	6–0	Ringwood City (8)
VIC	–	171	Hampton Park United Sparrows (7)	1–0	St Kilda (5)
VIC	–	172	Sydenham Park (5)	5–0	Balmoral FC (7)
VIC	–	173	Brimbank Stallions (6)	3–0	Corio SC (6)
VIC	–	174	Deakin University Ducks (9)	0–5	Westvale Olympic (5)
VIC	–	175	Sandringham SC (7)	3–6	Banyule City (5)
VIC	–	176	Moonee Valley Knights (9)	0–0†	Barnstonewoth United (8)
Barnstoneworth United advance 5–4 on penalties
VIC	–	177	Murray United (11)	w/o	Plenty Valley Lions (7)
VIC	–	178	Bundoora United (7)	2–0	Westgate FC (5)
VIC	–	179	Bendigo City (9)	0–1	Yarra Jets (9)
VIC	–	180	Old Ivanhoe (10)	0–3	Western Suburbs (5)
VIC	–	181	Mornington SC (5)	5–0	Moonee Ponds United (8)
VIC	–	182	Williamstown SC (6)	w/o	Casey Panthers (10)
Western Australia
WA	–	183	Northern City (7)	6–3	South Perth United (5)
WA	–	184	Wanneroo City (4)	1–2	Joondalup City (3)
WA	–	185	Dunsborough Town (-)	0–8	Forrestfield United (4)
WA	–	186	Cracovia SC (6)	1–3	Gwelup Croatia (3)
WA	–	187	Gosnells City (3)	3–1†	Hamersley Rovers (-)
WA	–	188	Kingsley Westside (3)	3–1	North Beach (5)
WA	–	189	Carramar Shamrock Rovers (4)	5–1	Bunbury Dynamos (-)
WA	–	190	Curtin University (3)	3–2	Quinns FC (4)
WA	–	191	Kalamunda City (3)	w/o	Football Bhutan WA (-)
WA	–	192	Eaton Dardanup (-)	2–16	East Perth (4)
WA	–	193	Ellenbrook United (6)	6–4	Swan Valley SC (-)
WA	–	194	Inglewood United (3)	8–0	Peel United (5)
WA	–	195	Balga SC (4)	2–3†	Subiaco AFC (3)
WA	–	196	Chipolopolo FC (-)	1–4	Perth AFC (6)
WA	–	197	Spearwood Dalmatinac (8)	0–4	Rockingham City (4)
WA	–	198	Mandurah City (3)	1–4	Murdoch University Melville (3)
WA	–	199	Wembley Downs (-)	3–0	Kwinana United (6)
WA	–	200	Ashfield SC (4)	7–0	Queens Park (7)
WA	–	201	Cockburn City (4)	2–0	Port Kennedy (6)
WA	–	202	UWA-Nedlands (3)	4–3	Floreat Athena (3)
WA	–	203	Canning City (4)	0–4	Morley Windmills (5)

Notes

- w/o = Walkover
- † = After Extra Time
- SA Byes: Campbelltown City (2), North Eastern MetroStars (2), Para Hills Knights (2), Sturt Lions (2), West Adelaide (2) and West Torrens Birkalla (2).
- TAS Byes: Clarence Zebras (2), Devonport City Strikers (2), Glenorchy Knights (2), Kingborough Lions United (2), Launceston City (2), Launceston United (2), Metro FC (4), Riverside Olympic (2), Somerset (3), South East United (2), South Hobart (2), Taroona (3), Ulverstone (2)

== Fourth round ==
Fed.	Zone	Tie no	Home team (Tier)	Score	Away team (Tier)
Australian Capital Territory
ACT	–	1	Canberra Juventus (2)	3–3†	Tuggeranong United (2)
Canberra Juventus advance 7–6 on penalties
ACT	–	2	Majura FC (-)	2–3	Narrabundah FC (4)
ACT	–	3	Monaro Panthers (2)	3–2	Canberra Olympic (2)
ACT	–	4	Weston Molonglo (3)	0–7	Queanbeyan City (2)
ACT	–	5	Tigers FC (2)	3–0	Belconnen United (2)
ACT	–	6	Brindabella Blues (2)	2–4	Canberra Croatia (2)
ACT	–	7	Canberra White Eagles (2)	2–0	O'Connor Knights (2)
ACT	–	8	West Canberra Wanderers (3)	0–3	ANU FC (3)
New South Wales
NSW	–	9	Canterbury Bankstown (3)	0–3	Hakoah Sydney City East (3)
NSW	–	10	Randwick City (5)	4–1	Earlwood Wanderers (7)
NSW	–	11	Toukley Gorokan (6)	0–2	Como Jannali (5)
NSW	–	12	Hills United (3)	1–2	Wollongong United (5)
NSW	–	13	Narrabeen (5)	1–2	Bankstown United (4)
NSW	–	14	Fraser Park (4)	5–1	Strathfield (5)
NSW	–	15	Fairfield Patrician Brothers (5)	2–1	The Ponds (5)
NSW	–	16	Blacktown City (2)	9–0	Terrigal United (5)
NSW	–	17	Macarthur Rams (3)	0–1	Hurstville Zagreb (3)
NSW	–	18	Manly United (2)	10–1	Mt Annan Mustangs (5)
NSW	–	19	Shellharbour FC (5)	2–0	NWS Spirit (2)
NSW	–	20	Rockdale Ilinden (2)	4–1	Cringila Lions (5)
NSW	–	21	Highlands FC (7)	0–5	Bonnyrigg White Eagles (4)
NSW	–	22	St George FC (2)	5–1	Dunbar Rovers (4)
NSW	–	23	SD Raiders (2)	7–3	Albion Park White Eagles (5)
NSW	–	24	Sydney CBD (6)	5–1	Marayong FC (5)
NSW	–	25	APIA Leichhardt (2)	10–1	Banksia Tigers (5)
NSW	–	26	Sydney Olympic (2)	2–1	Central Coast United (4)
NSW	–	27	Phoenix FC (5)	1–3	Bankstown City (3)
NSW	–	28	Bulli FC (5)	5–2	Gunners SC (5)
NSW	–	29	Sutherland Sharks (2)	6–0	Gladesville Ryde Magic (4)
NSW	–	30	Sydney University (4)	3–2	Dolls Point (5)
NSW	–	31	Southern & Ettalong Utd (5)	4–0	Lane Cove (6)
NSW	–	32	Blacktown Spartans (3)	2–1†	Moorebank Sports (5)
NSW	–	33	Camden Tigers (4)	1–1†	Northern Tigers (3)
Camden Tigers advance 5–3 on penalties
NSW	–	34	UNSW FC (2)	2–4	St George City (2)
NSW	–	35	Marconi Stallions (2)	4–1	Dulwich Hill (3)
NSW	–	36	Sydney United 58 (2)	3–0	Wollongong Wolves (2)
NSW	–	37	Glebe Gorillas (5)	3–2	Nepean FC (4)
NSW	–	38	Hawkesbury City (4)	2–6	Mounties Wanderers (4)
NSW	–	39	Coniston FC (5)	1–0	Fairfield Bulls (5)
NSW	–	40	Pendle Hill (5)	1–8	Inner West Hawks (4)
Northern NSW
NNSW	NTH	41	Pottsville Beach (5)	9–1	Tamworth FC (4)
NNSW	NTH	42	Moore Creek (4)	3–1	Demon Knights (4)
NNSW	NTH	43	Northern Storm (4)	3–1	Southern United (5)
NNSW	NTH	44	Oxley Vale Attunga (4)	2–0	Coffs City Utd FC (4)
NNSW	STH	45	Broadmeadow Magic (2)	8–0	Mayfield United (4)
NNSW	STH	46	Newcastle Suns (4)	0–7	Lambton Jaffas (2)
NNSW	STH	47	Weston Bears (2)	3–0	Kotara South (4)
NNSW	STH	48	Toronto Awaba (3)	2–4	Edgeworth Eagles (2)
NNSW	STH	49	Minmi FC (5)	0–5	Charlestown Azzurri (2)
NNSW	STH	50	Adamstown Rosebud (2)	5–1	University of Newcastle (4)
NNSW	STH	51	Maitland FC (2)	5–0	Belmont Swansea United (2)
NNSW	STH	52	Newcastle Olympic (2)	1–2	Valentine FC (2)
NNSW	STH	53	New Lambton (3)	2–3	Kahibah FC (2)
NNSW	STH	54	Warners Bay (4)	0–2	Dudley Redhead United (3)
NNSW	STH	55	West Wallsend (3)	9–0	Cessnock City Hornets (3)
NNSW	STH	56	Cooks Hill United (2)	3–0	Wallsend (3)
Northern Territory
NT	DAR	57	Darwin Hearts (2)	4–3	Mindil Aces (2)
NT	DAR	58	Darwin Olympic (2)	2–4	Port Darwin (2)
NT	DAR	59	Azzurri United (2)	4–1	Garuda FC (2)
NT	DAR	60	Hellenic Athletic (2)	2–2†	Palmerston Rovers (2)
Palmerston Rovers advance 7–6 on penalties
Queensland
QLD	WB v CC	61	Clinton FC (5)	7–0	SC Corinthians (5)
QLD	WC	62	Mackay Lions (5)	1–1†	Magpies FC (5)
Magpies FC advance 5–4 on penalties
QLD	NTH	63	Brothers Townsville (5)	3–2	MA Olympic FC (5)
QLD	FNG	64	Marlin Coast Rangers (5)	3–2	Leichhardt FC (5)
QLD	SEQ	65	Brisbane Knights (4)	3–4	Mudgeeraba SC (5)
QLD	SEQ	66	Robina City (3)	1–6	Moggill FC (5)
QLD	SEQ	67	Rochedale Rovers (2)	2–1	Noosa Lions (5)
QLD	SEQ	68	North Lakes United (5)	2–4	Broadbeach United (3)
QLD	SEQ	69	Gold Coast United (2)	7–0	Kawana FC (5)
QLD	SEQ	70	Western Spirit (6)	1–3	Caloundra FC (4)
QLD	SEQ	71	Mitchelton FC (4)	0–3	Grange Thistle (4)
QLD	SEQ	72	Yeronga Eagles (5)	3–4	Virginia United (4)
QLD	SEQ	73	Eastern Suburbs (2)	1–1†	Lions FC (2)
Lions FC advance 6–5 on penalties
QLD	SEQ	74	Pine Rivers United (7)	1–5	Ipswich FC (3)
QLD	SEQ	75	Olympic FC (2)	6–0	Samford Rangers (4)
QLD	SEQ	76	Nerang SC (6)	0–4	Peninsula Power (2)
QLD	SEQ	77	Holland Parks Hawks (3)	7–1	Mt Gravatt Hawks (5)
QLD	SEQ	78	Brisbane City (2)	3–0	Brisbane Strikers (3)
QLD	SEQ	79	Mooroondu FC (7)	0–11	North Star (3)
QLD	SEQ	80	Wynnum Wolves (2)	1–0	Moreton City Excelsior (2)
QLD	SEQ	81	Magic United (2)	0–4	AC Carina (5)
QLD	SEQ	82	Musgrave FC (5)	1–3†	St George Willawong (3)
QLD	SEQ	83	Capalaba FC (3)	3–2	Redlands United (3)
QLD	SEQ	84	Logan Lightning (3)	4–3	Kingscliff Wolves (5)
QLD	SEQ	85	Taringa Rovers (4)	1–3	Sunshine Coast Wanderers (3)

Fed.	Zone	Tie no	Home team (Tier)	Score	Away team (Tier)
QLD	SEQ	86	Nambour Yandina United (5)	1–3	Newmarket SFC (5)
QLD	SEQ	87	Coomera FC (5)	4–3	Maroochydore Swans (5)
QLD	SEQ	88	SWQ Thunder (4)	2–0	Palm Beach (5)
QLD	SEQ	89	Burleigh Heads (5)	1–3	Gold Coast Knights (2)
QLD	SEQ	90	Logan Metro (6)	3–6	Caboolture Sports (3)
QLD	SEQ	91	Ipswich Knights (5)	2–1	New Farm United (6)
QLD	SEQ	92	Southside Eagles (4)	0–6	Ripley Valley (6)
South Australia
SA	–	93	Modbury Jets (3)	2–0	Eastern United (3)
SA	–	94	Whyalla Lions (5)	1–4	West Adelaide (2)
SA	–	95	Campbelltown City (2)	2–3	FK Beograd (2)
SA	–	96	Adelaide Cobras (3)	7–4†	Western Strikers (3)
SA	–	97	Para Hills West (-)	1–6	Fulham United (3)
SA	–	98	Adelaide Croatia Raiders (3)	0–2	Pontian Eagles (4)
SA	–	99	Port Adelaide (4)	1–2	Noarlunga United (4)
SA	–	100	Cumberland United (3)	5–0	Mount Barker United (4)
SA	–	101	West Torrens Birkalla (2)	2–1	Salisbury United (3)
SA	–	102	Playford City (2)	2–4	Sturt Lions (2)
SA	–	103	Adelaide Olympic (3)	1–4	Adelaide City (2)
SA	–	104	Para Hills East (-)	1–3	Adelaide Atletico (3)
SA	–	105	Adelaide Comets (2)	1–0	Adelaide University (4)
SA	–	106	Tea Tree Gully (-)	1–2	Gawler Eagles (4)
SA	–	107	Croydon FC (2)	4–1	MetroStars (2)
SA	–	108	Salisbury Inter (4)	0–3	Para Hills (2)
Tasmania
TAS	–	109	South Hobart (2)	10–0	Ulverstone (2)
TAS	–	110	Somerset (3)	1–2	Hobart City (3)
TAS	–	111	Kingborough Lions United (2)	4–0	Riverside Olympic (2)
TAS	–	112	Devonport City Strikers (2)	7–0	Taroona FC (3)
TAS	–	113	Barnstoneworth United (5)	1–0	Metro FC (4)
TAS	–	114	Launceston United (2)	2–3	South East United (2)
TAS	–	115	Olympia FC Warriors (3)	2–4	Glenorchy Knights (2)
TAS	–	116	Clarence Zebras (2)	2–1	Launceston City (2)
Victoria
VIC	–	117	Epping City (7)	0–3	Oakleigh Cannons (2)
VIC	–	118	Westvale Olympic (5)	1–0	Langwarrin (3)
VIC	–	119	Fawkner SC (7)	0–1	Murray United (11)
VIC	–	120	Hampton East Brighton (5)	1–2	South Melbourne (2)
VIC	–	121	Skye United (5)	0–5	Brunswick Juventus (3)
VIC	–	122	Whittlesea United (4)	4–3	Dandenong City (2)
VIC	–	123	Beaumaris SC (5)	7–1	Dallas City (7)
VIC	–	124	Bentleigh Greens (2)	3–0	Moreland City (4)
VIC	–	125	Altona City (4)	3–1	Bundoora United (7)
VIC	–	126	Bayside Argonauts (4)	0–1	Port Melbourne Sharks (3)
VIC	–	127	Western Eagles (6)	2–3	Avondale FC (2)
VIC	–	128	Kings Domain (8)	1–4	Williamstown SC (6)
VIC	–	129	Brunswick City (2)	w/o	Moreland Eagles (10)
VIC	–	130	Malvern City (4)	0–5	Heidelberg United (2)
VIC	–	131	Werribee City (4)	5–3†	Pascoe Vale (5)
VIC	–	132	Barnstonewoth United (8)	0–5	Uni Hill Eagles (6)
VIC	–	133	Keilor Park (4)	2–0	Brimbank Stallions (6)
VIC	–	134	Old Scotch (5)	4–3†	North Geelong Warriors (3)
VIC	–	135	Bulleen Lions (3)	3–2	Springvale White Eagles (4)
VIC	–	136	Lalor United (5)	1–2	Sydenham Park (5)
VIC	–	137	Brunswick Zebras (7)	2–4†	Essendon Royals (4)
VIC	–	138	Collingwood City (5)	2–4	North Sunshine Eagles (3)
VIC	–	139	Northcote City (3)	3–1†	Western Suburbs (5)
VIC	–	140	Craigieburn City (7)	0–2	Altona East Phoenix (5)
VIC	–	141	FC Melbourne Srbija (3)	3–1	Altona Magic (2)
VIC	–	142	Melbourne Knights (3)	0–1	Yarraville Glory (5)
VIC	–	143	Mill Park (6)	0–2	Eastern Lions (4)
VIC	–	144	South Springvale (5)	1–2	Caroline Springs George Cross (2)
VIC	–	145	Western United (3)	2–1	Mornington SC (5)
VIC	–	146	Eltham Redbacks (3)	4–0	Yarra Jets (9)
VIC	–	147	Surf Coast (6)	w/o	Sunbury United (7)
VIC	–	148	Hume City (2)	6–0	Riversdale SC (8)
VIC	–	149	Green Gully (2)	1–2	Goulburn Valley Suns (4)
VIC	–	150	Dandenong Thunder (2)	1–0	Manningham United Blues (3)
VIC	–	151	Heatherton United (7)	0–1	Albion Rovers (6)
VIC	–	152	Nunawading City (4)	0–4	Preston Lions (2)
VIC	–	153	Ballarat City (5)	1–3	St Albans Saints (2)
VIC	–	154	Doveton SC (5)	1–4	Bentleigh United Cobras (7)
VIC	–	155	Hampton Park United Sparrows (7)	1–6	Box Hill United (4)
VIC	–	156	Kingston City (4)	1–4	Banyule City (5)
Western Australia
WA	–	157	Armadale SC (2)	1–4	Perth RedStar (2)
WA	–	158	Ellenbrook United (-)	2–3	Rockingham City (4)
WA	–	159	Wembley Downs (4)	1–0	Subiaco AFC (3)
WA	–	160	Western Knights (2)	4–2	Kalamunda City (4)
WA	–	161	Ashfield SC (4)	2–1	Northern City (7)
WA	–	162	Bayswater City (2)	2–1	Murdoch University Melville (3)
WA	–	163	UWA-Nedlands (3)	1–4	Dianella White Eagles (2)
WA	–	164	Forrestfield United (4)	1–2	Curtin University (3)
WA	–	165	Joondalup City (3)	3–1	Gosnells City (4)
WA	–	166	Kingsley Westside (3)	0–1	Balcatta FC (2)
WA	–	167	Carramah Shamrock Rovers (4)	0–3	Fremantle City (2)
WA	–	168	East Perth (4)	3–1	Stirling Macedonia (2)
WA	–	169	Perth AFC (6)	0–4	Cockburn City (3)
WA	–	170	Morley-Windmills (4)	3–0	Gwelup Croatia (3)
WA	–	171	Olympic Kingsway (2)	4–1	Perth Azzurri (2)
WA	–	172	Inglewood United (3)	3–2	Sorrento FC (2)

Notes

- w/o = Walkover
- † = After Extra Time
- NT Bye: Casuarina FC

== Fifth round ==
Fed.	Zone	Tie no	Home team (Tier)	Score	Away team (Tier)
Australian Capital Territory
ACT	–	1	Narrabundah FC (4)	1–9	Monaro Panthers (2)
ACT	–	2	Canberra White Eagles (2)	0–4	Canberra Croatia (2)
ACT	–	3	ANU FC (3)	0–2	Tigers FC (2)
ACT	–	4	Canberra Juventus (2)	0–2	Queanbeyan City (2)
New South Wales
NSW	–	5	Hakoah Sydney City East (3)	4–1	Bonnyrigg White Eagles (4)
NSW	–	6	Shellharbour FC (5)	1–5	SD Raiders (2)
NSW	–	7	Fraser Park (4)	6–2	Bankstown City (3)
NSW	–	8	Bulli FC (5)	0–2	Sydney United 58 (2)
NSW	–	9	Inner West Hawks (4)	1–4	Southern & Ettalong United (5)
NSW	–	10	Blacktown City (2)	2–0	Blacktown Spartans (3)
NSW	–	11	Mounties Wanderers (4)	1–2	St George FC (2)
NSW	–	12	Wollongong United (5)	5–0	Sydney CBD (6)
NSW	–	13	Randwick City (5)	2–1	Como Jannali (5)
NSW	–	14	Rockdale Ilinden (2)	6–0	Fairfield Patrician Brothers (5)
NSW	–	15	Hurstville Zagreb (3)	0–3	APIA Leichhardt (2)
NSW	–	16	Sydney Olympic (2)	1–0	Marconi Stallions (2)
NSW	–	17	Coniston FC (5)	4–4†	Bankstown United (4)
Bankstown United advance 5–3 on penalties
NSW	–	18	Sutherland Sharks (2)	1–2	Manly United (2)
NSW	–	19	Sydney University (4)	3–3†	Glebe Gorillas (5)
Sydney University advance 4–3 on penalties
NSW	–	20	Camden Tigers (4)	1–5	St George City (2)
Northern NSW
NNSW	NTH	21	Moore Creek (4)	1–2†	Northern Storm (4)
NNSW	NTH	22	Oxley Vale Attunga (4)	1–2	Pottsville Beach (5)
NNSW	STH	23	Edgeworth Eagles (2)	3–0	Cooks Hill United (2)
NNSW	STH	24	Weston Bears (2)	2–1	Broadmeadow Magic (2)
NNSW	STH	25	Valentine FC (2)	0–3	Maitland FC (2)
NNSW	STH	26	Adamstown Rosebud (2)	5–2	Dudley Redhead United (3)
NNSW	STH	27	Lambton Jaffas (2)	1–3	Kahibah FC (2)
NNSW	STH	28	West Wallsend (3)	0–2	Charlestown Azzurri (2)
Northern Territory
NT	ASP	29	Stormbirds FC (-)	1–0	Alice Springs Verdi (-)
NT	DAR	30	Port Darwin (2)	4–0	Casuarina FC (2)
NT	DAR	31	Azzurri United (2)	9–0	Palmerston Rovers (2)
Queensland
QLD	REG	32	Magpies FC (5)	1–2	Clinton (5)
QLD	FNG v NTH	33	Marlin Coast Rangers (5)	4–1	Brothers Townsville (5)
QLD	SEQ	34	Moggill FC (5)	6–3	Ripley Valley (6)
QLD	SEQ	35	Coomera FC (5)	2–3	Caboolture Sports (3)
QLD	SEQ	36	Broadbeach United (3)	0–1†	Logan Lightning (3)
QLD	SEQ	37	Virginia United (4)	3–3†	Ipswich FC (3)
Virginia United advance 5–4 on penalties
QLD	SEQ	38	Grange Thistle (4)	0–2	Gold Coast United (2)
QLD	SEQ	39	Peninsula Power (2)	4–0	Newmarket SFC (5)
QLD	SEQ	40	Olympic FC (2)	4–0	Ipswich Knights (5)

Fed.	Zone	Tie no	Home team (Tier)	Score	Away team (Tier)
QLD	SEQ	41	North Star (3)	2–1	Caloundra FC (4)
QLD	SEQ	42	SWQ Thunder (4)	1–2	Capalaba FC (3)
QLD	SEQ	43	Wynnum Wolves (2)	0–3	Rochedale Rovers (2)
QLD	SEQ	44	Gold Coast Knights (2)	3–3†	Sunshine Coast Wanderers (3)
Sunshine Coast Wanderers advance 5–3 on penalties
QLD	SEQ	45	Brisbane City (2)	2–3	St George Willawong (3)
QLD	SEQ	46	Lions FC (2)	4–1†	Holland Parks Hawks (3)
QLD	SEQ	47	AC Carina (5)	3–2†	Mudgeeraba SC (5)
South Australia
SA	–	48	Gawler Eagles (4)	1–4	Adelaide City (2)
SA	–	49	Pontian Eagles (4)	4–5	West Torrens Birkalla (2)
SA	–	50	Cumberland United (3)	6–0	Noarlunga United (4)
SA	–	51	Modbury Jets (3)	0–0†	Adelaide Atletico (3)
Adelaide Atletico advance 6–5 on penalties
SA	–	52	Para Hills (2)	2–0	Sturt Lions (2)
SA	–	53	Fulham United (3)	5–3†	Adelaide Comets (2)
SA	–	54	West Adelaide (2)	0–3	FK Beograd (2)
SA	–	55	Croydon FC (2)	1–3	Adelaide Cobras (3)
Tasmania
TAS	–	56	Devonport City Strikers (2)	3–0	Clarence Zebras (2)
TAS	–	57	Kingborough Lions United (2)	8–0	Barnstoneworth United (5)
TAS	–	58	South Hobart (2)	4–1	Hobart City (3)
TAS	–	59	South East United (2)	1–4	Glenorchy Knights (2)
Victoria
VIC	–	60	Whittlesea United (4)	1–2	North Sunshine Eagles (3)
VIC	–	61	Banyule City (5)	0–1	Bentleigh Greens (2)
VIC	–	62	South Melbourne (2)	1–4	Bulleen Lions (3)
VIC	–	63	Hume City (2)	2–2†	Brunswick Juventus (3)
Brunswick Juventus FC advance 5–4 on penalties
VIC	–	64	Keilor Park (4)	1–1†	Preston Lions (2)
Preston Lions advance 3–2 on penalties
VIC	–	65	Altona East Phoenix (5)	2–1	Dandenong Thunder (2)
VIC	–	66	Brunswick City (3)	5–1	Western United Youth (3)
VIC	–	67	Beaumaris SC (5)	3–3†	Port Melbourne Sharks (3 )
Port Melbourne Sharks advance 5–4 on penalties
VIC	–	68	Eastern Lions (3)	2–0	Westvale Olympic (5)
VIC	–	69	Surf Coast (6)	0–5	Box Hill United (4)
VIC	–	70	Yarraville Glory (5)	0–5	Heidelberg United (2)
VIC	–	71	Northcote City (3)	7–1	Bentleigh United Cobras (7)
VIC	–	72	Melbourne Srbija (3)	1–3†	St Albans Saints (2)
VIC	–	73	Albion Rovers (6)	1–5	Caroline Springs George Cross (2)
VIC	–	74	Uni Hill Eagles (6)	2–0	Altona City (4)
VIC	–	75	Goulburn Valley Suns (4)	5–2	Murray United (11)
VIC	–	76	Williamstown SC (6)	2–0	Old Scotch SC (5)
VIC	–	77	Werribee City (4)	0–2	Avondale FC (2)
VIC	–	78	Sydenham Park (5)	1–4†	Oakleigh Cannons (2)
VIC	–	79	Eltham Redbacks (3)	4–0	Essendon Royals (4)
Western Australia
WA	–	80	Ashfield SC (4)	3–4	Rockingham City (4)
WA	–	81	Fremantle City (2)	3–1	Wembley Downs (4)
WA	–	82	Western Knights (2)	2–3†	Curtin University (3)
WA	–	83	Joondalup City (3)	0–1	Bayswater City (2)
WA	–	84	Perth RedStar (2)	3–0	Inglewood United (3)
WA	–	85	Dianella White Eagles (2)	7–1	East Perth (4)
WA	–	86	Balcatta FC (2)	0–1	Olympic Kingsway (2)
WA	–	87	Morley-Windmills (4)	3–1	Cockburn City (3)

Notes:

- † = After Extra Time
- NT Bye: Darwin Hearts

== Sixth round ==
Fed.	Zone	Tie no	Home team (Tier)	Score	Away team (Tier)
Australian Capital Territory
ACT	—	1	Queanbeyan City (2)	0–2	Canberra Croatia (2)
ACT	—	2	Monaro Panthers (2)	1–3	Tigers FC (2)
New South Wales
NSW	—	3	Fraser Park (4)	1–0	Bankstown United (4)
NSW	—	4	APIA Leichhardt (2)	2–0	Sydney University (4)
NSW	—	5	St George FC (2)	0–2	Blacktown City (2)
NSW	—	6	Sydney Olympic (2)	4–0	Randwick City (5)
NSW	—	7	Wollongong United (5)	5–2	Southern & Ettalong United (5)
NSW	—	8	St George City (2)	1–2	SD Raiders (2)
NSW	—	9	Manly United (2)	1–2	Sydney United 58 (2)
NSW	—	10	Hakoah Sydney City East (3)	0–5	Rockdale Ilinden (2)
Northern New South Wales
NNSW	—	11	Maitland (2)	10–1	Northern Storm (4)
NNSW	—	12	Pottsville Beach (5)	0–8	Weston Bears (2)
NNSW	—	13	Kahibah FC (2)	1–0	Adamstown Rosebud (2)
NNSW	—	14	Edgeworth Eagles (2)	1–0†	Charlestown Azzurri (2)
Northern Territory
NT	DAR v ASP	15	Port Darwin (2)	4–1	Alice Springs Stormbirds (-)
NT	DAR	16	Darwin Hearts (2)	1–3	Azzurri United (2)
Queensland
QLD	REG	17	Marlin Coast Rangers (5)	3–1	Clinton (5)
QLD	SEQ	18	Rochedale Rovers (2)	6–0	Capalaba (3)
QLD	SEQ	19	Olympic FC (2)	0–1	Lions FC (2)
QLD	SEQ	20	Logan Lightning (3)	2–0	St George Willawong (3)
QLD	SEQ	21	North Star (3)	2–0	Gold Coast United (2)
QLD	SEQ	22	Caboolture Sports (3)	4–0	AC Carina (5)

Fed.	Zone	Tie no	Home team (Tier)	Score	Away team (Tier)
QLD	SEQ	23	Sunshine Coast Wanderers (3)	4–0	Virginia United (4)
QLD	SEQ	24	Peninsula Power (2)	4–1	Moggill (5)
South Australia
SA	—	25	Para Hills (2)	2–4	Adelaide Omonia Cobras (3)
SA	—	26	Cumberland United (3)	1–0	Adelaide City (2)
SA	—	27	Adelaide Atletico (3)	0–1	FK Beograd (2)
SA	—	28	Fulham United (3)	3–5†	West Torrens Birkalla (2)
Tasmania
TAS	—	29	Devonport City Strikers (2)	4–2†	Glenorchy Knights (2)
TAS	—	30	Kingborough Lions United (2)	2–2†	South Hobart (2)
Kingborough Lions United advance 4–3 on penalties
Victoria
VIC	—	31	North Sunshine Eagles (3)	4–2	Eltham Redbacks (3)
VIC	—	32	St Albans Saints (2)	0–2	Oakleigh Cannons (2)
VIC	—	33	Avondale FC (2)	4–0	Brunswick City (3)
VIC	—	34	Bulleen Lions (3)	6–0	Port Melbourne Sharks (3)
VIC	—	35	Bentleigh Greens (2)	3–0	Northcote City (3)
VIC	—	36	Williamstown SC (6)	1–2	Caroline Springs George Cross (2)
VIC	—	37	Altona East Phoenix (5)	0–3	Heidelberg United (2)
VIC	—	38	Goulburn Valley Suns (4)	2–1	Eastern Lions (4)
VIC	—	39	Uni Hill Eagles (6)	0–2	Preston Lions (2)
VIC	—	40	Box Hill United (4)	0–1†	Brunswick Juventus (3)
Western Australia
WA	—	41	Rockingham City (4)	1–2	Fremantle City (2)
WA	—	42	Morley-Windmills (4)	1–3	Olympic Kingsway (2)
WA	—	43	Dianella White Eagles (2)	1–2	Bayswater City (2)
WA	—	44	Perth RedStar (2)	3–1	Curtin University (3)

Notes:

- † = After Extra Time

== Seventh round ==
Fed.	Zone	Tie no	Home team (Tier)	Score	Away team (Tier)
Australian Capital Territory
ACT	—	1	Canberra Croatia (2)	1–5	Tigers FC (2)
New South Wales
NSW	—	2	SD Raiders (2)	2–1	Wollongong United (5)
NSW	—	3	Blacktown City (2)	0–4	Sydney United 58 (2)
NSW	—	4	Fraser Park (4)	2–3	Sydney Olympic (2)
NSW	—	5	APIA Leichhardt (2)	1–0	Rockdale Ilinden (2)
Northern New South Wales
NNSW	—	6	Maitland (2)	4–0	Kahibah FC (2)
NNSW	—	7	Weston Bears (2)	1–0	Edgeworth Eagles (2)
Northern Territory
NT	—	8	Port Darwin (2)	1–6	Azzurri United (2)
Queensland
QLD	—	9	Sunshine Coast Wanderers (3)	0–3	Lions FC (2)
QLD	—	10	Marlin Coast Rangers (5)	3–1	Logan Lightning (3)
QLD	—	11	Caboolture Sports (3)	0–3	Rochedale Rovers (2)
QLD	—	12	North Star (3)	3–7	Peninsula Power (2)

Fed.	Zone	Tie no	Home team (Tier)	Score	Away team (Tier)
South Australia
SA	—	13	Cumberland United (3)	3–2	Adelaide Omonia Cobras (3)
SA	—	14	FK Beograd (2)	3–0	West Torrens Birkalla (2)
Tasmania
TAS	—	15	Kingborough Lions United (2)	1–1†	Devonport City Strikers (2)
Kingborough Lions United advance 5–3 on penalties
Victoria
VIC	—	16	Goulburn Valley Suns (4)	1–2	Bulleen Lions (3)
VIC	—	17	Preston Lions (2)	6–0	Caroline Springs George Cross (2)
VIC	—	18	Brunswick Juventus (3)	2–1†	Oakleigh Cannons (2)
VIC	—	19	Heidelberg United (2)	2–0	Bentleigh Greens (2)
VIC	—	20	North Sunshine Eagles (3)	3–2	Avondale FC (2)
Western Australia
WA	—	21	Fremantle City (2)	3–1	Olympic Kingsway (2)
WA	—	22	Bayswater City (2)	3–2	Perth RedStar (2)

Notes:

- † = After Extra Time

== Victorian play-off round ==
Fed.	Zone	Tie no	Home team (Tier)	Score	Away team (Tier)
Victoria
VIC	—	1	Brunswick Juventus (3)	1–0	Bulleen Lions (3)
