= 2026 FSA Federation Cup =

2026 Australia Cup South Australian preliminary rounds

Tournament details
- Country: Australia
- Dates: 20 February–11 July
- Teams: 58

Tournament statistics
- Matches played: 26
- Goals scored: 128 (4.92 per match)

The 2026 Football South Australia Federation Cup, also known as the Australia Cup South Australian preliminary rounds (Note: Also known as the Hahn Australia Cup South Australian preliminary rounds for sponsorship reasons.) until the semi-finals, was the 113th running of the Federation Cup, the main soccer knockout cup competition in South Australia. The competition also functioned as part of the 2026 Australia Cup preliminary rounds, with the two finalists qualifying for the main competition.

North Eastern MetroStars were the defending champions, losing 1–4 in the second round to Croydon FC.

== Schedule ==
Round	Draw date	Match dates	No. of fixtures	Teams	New entries this round
First round	2 February	20 February–7 March	26	58 → 32	52
Second round	11 March	1–4 April	16	32 → 16	6
Third round	8 April	24–25 April	8	16 → 8	None
Quarter-finals		12–19 May	4	8 → 4	None
Semi-finals		10–17 June	2	4 → 2	None
Final	—	12 July	1	2 → 1	None

== Teams ==
Location of teams participating in the Federation Cup.

58 teams participatedin the competition: 49 from the Greater Adelaide area, three from Mount Gambier, two from the Adelaide Hills region, and one from Gawler, Port Pirie, Naracoorte, and Whyalla. National Premier Leagues South Australia, State League One and State League Two represent levels 2–4 on the unofficial Australian league system, and are required to participate in the Federation Cup. The South Australian Regional Leagues represent level 5. The South Australian Amateur Soccer League was not represented in the national league system. Adelaide United Youth werenot eligible for the tournament, as the senior team entered the Australia Cup competition at the round of 32.

Football South Australia affiliate clubs
NPL SA (2)	SA State League 1 (3)	SA State League 2 (4)	
NPL SA (2)	SA State League 1 (3)	North	South
Adelaide City	Adelaide Atletico	Angle Vale	Adelaide Hills Hawks
Adelaide Comets	Adelaide Blue Eagles	Barossa United	Adelaide Titans
Campbelltown City	Adelaide Croatia Raiders	Elizabeth Downs	Adelaide University
Croydon FC	Adelaide Olympic	Elizabeth Grove	Ghan United
FK Beograd	Adelaide Omonia Cobras	Gawler Eagles	Mount Barker United
North Eastern MetroStars	Cumberland United	Modbury Vista	Noarlunga United
Para Hills Knights	Eastern United	Northern Demons	Plympton Bulldogs
Playford City	Fulham United	Pontian Eagles	Seaford Rangers
Sturt Lions	Modbury Jets	Port Adelaide	Vipers FC
West Adelaide	Salisbury United	Salisbury Inter	Western Strikers
West Torrens Birkalla	South Adelaide Panthers		
	The Cove		
Non-affiliate clubs
Regional Leagues (5)		Amateur Leagues (-)	
Limestone Coast	Whyalla	Amateur Leagues (-)	
Blue Lake	Whyalla Lions	Adelaide Brasfoot	BOSA FC
Gambier Centrals		Ingle Farm	Messinian Association Hawks
International SC		Old Ignatians	Para Hills East
Naracoorte United		Para Hills West	Sturt Marion Thunder
		Tea Tree Gully	West Adelaide Raptors

== Bracket ==
First round Third preliminary round
Elizabeth Grove	2
Modbury Jets	6
Messinian Association Hawks	1
Eastern United	11
Para Hills East	2
South Adelaide Panthers	0
BOSA FC	0
Adelaide Atletico	6
Whyalla Lions	3
Naracoorte United	1
Adelaide Titans	0
FK Beograd	1
Para Hills West (p)	3 (5)
Adelaide Blue Eagles	3 (4)
The Cove	1
Fulham United	4
Modbury Vista	2
Adelaide Comets	5
Adelaide University	4
Adelaide Brasfoot	2
International SC	0
Adelaide Croatia Raiders	1
Pontian Eagles	2
West Adelaide Raptors	1
Old Ignatians	0
Salisbury United	3
Cumberland United	4
Northern Demons	2
Mount Barker United (a.e.t.)	4
Angle Vale	2
Port Adelaide	3
Sturt Marion Thunder	1
Noarlunga United (a.e.t.)	3
Ghan United	1
Tea Tree Gully	3
Adelaide Hills Hawks	2
Blue Lake	0
Gawler Eagles	2
Gambier Centrals	0
Adelaide Olympic	8
Adelaide City	3
Seaford Rangers	0
Vipers FC	1
Salisbury Inter	2
Elizabeth Downs	0
Playford City	4
Croydon FC	10
Plympton Bulldogs	2
Omonia Cobras	3
Ingle Farm	0
Barossa United	1
Western Strikers	3

Second round Fourth preliminary round
Modbury Jets	2
Eastern United	0
Para Hills East	1
Adelaide Atletico	3
Whyalla Lions	1
West Adelaide	4
Campbelltown City	2
FK Beograd	3
Para Hills West	1
Fulham United	6
Adelaide Comets	1
Adelaide University	0
Adelaide Croatia Raiders	0
Pontian Eagles	2
West Torrens Birkalla	2
Salisbury United	1
Cumberland United	5
Mount Barker United	0
Port Adelaide	1
Noarlunga United	2
Tea Tree Gully	1
Gawler Eagles	2
Adelaide Olympic	1
Adelaide City	4
Salisbury Inter	0
Para Hills Knights	3
Playford City	2
Sturt Lions	4
Croydon FC	4
North Eastern MetroStars	1
Omonia Cobras (a.e.t.)	7
Western Strikers	4

Third round Fifth preliminary round
Modbury Jets	0 (5)
Adelaide Atletico (p)	0 (6)
West Adelaide	0
FK Beograd	3
Fulham United (a.e.t.)	5
Adelaide Comets	3
Pontian Eagles	4
West Torrens Birkalla	5
Cumberland United	6
Noarlunga United	0
Gawler Eagles	1
Adelaide City	4
Para Hills Knights	2
Sturt Lions	0
Croydon FC	1
Omonia Cobras	3

Quarter-finals; Sixth preliminary round
Adelaide Atletico	0
FK Beograd	3
Fulham United (a.e.t.)	3
West Torrens Birkalla	5
Cumberland United	1
Adelaide City	0
Para Hills Knights	2
Omonia Cobras	4

Semi-finals; Seventh preliminary round
FK Beograd	3
West Torrens Birkalla	0
Cumberland United	3
Omonia Cobras	2

Final
FK Beograd (a.e.t.)	5
Cumberland United	2

== First round ==
The first round of the Federation Cup was also the third round of the 2026 Australia Cup preliminary rounds. National Premier League teams Campbelltown City, North Eastern MetroStars, Para Hills Knights, Sturt Lions, West Adelaide, and West Torrens Birkalla were given a bye into this round.

All times are in ACDT.

20 February	BOSA FC (-)	0–6	Adelaide Atletico (3)	Oakden
18:15		Report	Tateishi 22'; Maio 60', 71'; Lanzotti 77'; A. Totani 84'; M. Totani 87'	Stadium: Adelaide City Park; Referee: Garry Powers

20 February	Cumberland United (3)	4–2	Northern Demons (4)	Clarence Gardens
19:30	Ekeland 45+1'; Dunton 57'; Rimington 62'; Redman 90+3'	Report	Ramos 24', 86' (pen.)	Stadium: Lady Burra Stadium; Referee: Curtis Wordsworth

20 February	Elizabeth Grove (4)	2–6	Modbury Jets (3)	Elizabeth
19:30	Hall 36'; Relihan 72'	Report	L. McCabe 16'; Akimoto 39'; H. McCabe 56' (pen.), 85' (pen.); Tassotti 58'; Sunday 90+1'	Stadium: Dauntsey Reserve; Referee: Marc Padros

20 February	Port Adelaide (4)	3–1	Sturt Marion Thunder (-)	Taperoo
19:30	Kogoj 45+1', 80'; Davis 72'	Report	Kurban 21'	Stadium: Ngarrpadla Josie Agius Reserve; Referee: Alexander Diamond

20 February	Croydon FC (2)	10–2	Plympton Bulldogs (4)	Regency Park
19:30	Klimek 9', 76'; Bartkowski 23', 64', 71'; Kato 27'; O. Trimboli 40', 43'; Goode 69'; L. Trimboli 79'	Report	Searle 28'; Ntafillis 90+4' (pen.)	Stadium: Regency Park; Referee: Andrew Kite

20 February	Messinian Association Hawks (-)	1–11	Eastern United (3)	Athelstone
19:30	Bouzalas 10'	Report	Ahmed 7'; Koyanagi 33', 65'; Bandara 35', 52'; Panagoulias 68', 74', 77'; Yohena 80'; Reade 85'; Pauli 89'	Stadium: Athelstone Recreation Reserve; Referee: Mark Michael

20 February	Vipers FC (4)	1–2	Salisbury Inter (4)	St Clair
19:30	Velinov 40' (pen.)	Report	Marchioro 49'; Capone 87'	Stadium: Evian Football Park; Referee: David Alberton

20 February	Elizabeth Downs (4)	0–4	Playford City (2)	Elizabeth Downs
19:30		Report	Pounendis 13', 80'; Babasaki 73', 88'	Stadium: Argana Park; Referee: Tom Brinkworth

20 February	Adelaide Omonia Cobras (3)	3–0	Ingle Farm (-)	Plympton
20:00	Sakoulidis 16', 19'; Vliet 83'	Report		Stadium: Pro Paint and Panel Oval; Referee: Gary Mooney

20 February	Adelaide City (2)	3–0	Seaford Rangers (4)	Oakden
20:15	Lawrie-Lattanzio 58'; Kitano 87'; Kasumovic 89'	Report		Stadium: Adelaide City Park; Referee: Dion Turner

21 February	Old Ignatians (-)	0–3	Salisbury United (3)	Athelstone
9:00		Report	Majetic 67'; Farrell 72', 84'	Stadium: Saint Ignatius' College; Referee: Jacky Chang

21 February	Blue Lake (5)	0–2	Gawler Eagles (4)	Mount Gambier
16:30		Report	Binga 11'; Verdon 75' (pen.)	Stadium: Malseed Park; Referee: Cameron Joy

21 February	Whyalla Lions (5)	3–1	Naracoorte United (5)	Whyalla
18:00	Gonzalez 20'; Cash 34', 78'	Report	Halumwane 71' (pen.)	Stadium: Worsnop Park; Referee: Zakir Hussaini

21 February	Gambier Centrals (5)	0–8	Adelaide Olympic (3)	Mount Gambier
18:30		Report	Habonimana 7', 10'; Pudler 28' (pen.), 35' (pen.); Athanasiadis 44'; Demasi 51', 83'; Cerracchio 62'	Stadium: MGA Park; Referee: Denis Palushaj

21 February	Mount Barker United (4)	4–2 (a.e.t.)	Angle Vale (4)	Mount Barker
19:00	Howie 29'; Knight 33', 111'; Meseldzija 96'	Report	Henshall 7'; Darmenia 25'	Stadium: Summit Sport and Recreation Park; Referee: Thomas Gilchrist

21 February	The Cove (3)	1–4	Fulham United (3)	Trott Park
19:00	Rideout 18'	Report	Ikonomopoulos 11'; Aunger 20'; Fusco 86'; Scalzi 90'	Stadium: Southern Soccer Facility; Referee: Judah Tan

21 February	Pontian Eagles (4)	2–1	West Adelaide Raptors (-)	Paralowie
19:00	Katsigiannis 6' (pen.), 62'	Report	Udycz 36'	Stadium: Yalumba Drive Reserve; Referee: Zack Brittan

21 February	Modbury Vista (4)	2–5	Adelaide Comets (2)	Wynn Vale
19:00	Cole 32' (pen.); Trotta 41'	Report	Goode 36', 51'; Gomwikezwa 47', 63'; Porter 83'	Stadium: Newspot Stadium; Referee: Mon Bahadur Khadka

21 February	Adelaide Titans (4)	0–1	FK Beograd (2)	West Beach
19:00		Report	Orchard 56'	Stadium: West Beach Parks Football Centre; Referee: Daniel Faulkner

21 February	International SC (5)	0–1	Adelaide Croatia Raiders (3)	Moorak
19:30		Report	King-Byrne 29' (pen.)	Stadium: Casadio Park; Referee: Jayden Betterman

22 February	Para Hills West (-)	3–3 (a.e.t.) (5–4 p)	Adelaide Blue Eagles (3)	Salisbury East
14:45	Skirving 3', 49', 88' (pen.)	Report	Gray 45+3', 85'; Dárgenio 56'	Stadium: Manor Farm Oval; Referee: Samuel McLeod Banwell

22 February	Para Hills East (-)	2–0	South Adelaide Panthers (3)	Modbury North
16:00	Capogreco 3'; Miller 83'	Report		Stadium: Ladywood Reserve; Referee: Gary Mooney

22 February	Tea Tree Gully (-)	3–2	Adelaide Hills Hawks (4)	Surrey Downs
16:00	Turner 23'; Langridge 54'; Roberts 71'	Report	Morakis 90+2'; Hosking 90+3'	Stadium: Tilley Reserve; Referee: Henry Day

27 February	Noarlunga United (4)	3–1 (a.e.t.)	Ghan United (4)	Morphett Vale
20:00	O'Toole 61'; Hameid 101', 108'	Report	Abbasi 3'	Stadium: Wilfred Taylor Reserve; Referee: Liam Toovey

28 February	Barossa United (4)	1–3	Western Strikers (4)	Nuriootpa
15:00	Siddik 77'	Report	Bogdanovic 37'; Pilon-St-Louis 72'; Ditroia 90+4'	Stadium: Barossa United Stadium; Referee: David Alberton

7 March	Adelaide University (4)	4–2 (a.e.t.)	Adelaide Brasfoot (-)	North Adelaide
17:00	Andreou 21'; Scorsonelli 66', 119'; Wade 120'	Report	Eduardo Faleiro 33'; Tse 89'	Stadium: University Ovals; Referee: Luca Castello

== Second round ==
The second round of the Federation Cup was also the fourth round of the 2026 Australia Cup preliminary rounds, featuring 26 teams from the previous round and the six teams from the National Premier League who were not drawn into the first round.

Number of teams per tier still in competition
NPL SA (2)	State League 1 (3)	State League 2 (4)	Regional (5)	Amateur (-)	Total
11 / 11	9 / 12	8 / 20	1 / 5	3 / 10	32 / 58

1 April	Tea Tree Gully (-)	1–2	Gawler Eagles (4)	Surrey Downs
19:30				Stadium: Tilley Reserve

1 April	Adelaide Comets (2)	1–0	Adelaide University (4)	Adelaide
19:45				Stadium: LJ Hooker-Mile End Sports Park

2 April	Cumberland United (3)	5–0	Mount Barker United (4)	Clarence Gardens
19:00				Stadium: Lady Burra Stadium

2 April	West Torrens Birkalla (2)	2–1	Salisbury United (3)	Novar Gardens
19:00				Stadium: Jack Smith Park

2 April	Playford City (2)	2–4	Sturt Lions (2)	Edinburgh North
19:00				Stadium: Ramsay Park

2 April	Para Hills East (-)	1–3	Adelaide Atletico (3)	Para Hills
19:30				Stadium: Para Hills Oval

2 April	Adelaide Omonia Cobras (3)	7–4 (a.e.t.)	Western Strikers (4)	Plympton
19:30				Stadium: Pro Paint and Panel Oval

2 April	Campbelltown City (2)	2–3	FK Beograd (2)	Newton
19:30				Stadium: Steve Woodcock Sports Centre

2 April	Para Hills West (-)	1–6	Fulham United (3)	Salisbury East
19:30				Stadium: Manor Farm Oval

2 April	Adelaide Croatia Raiders (3)	0–2	Pontian Eagles (4)	Gepps Cross
19:30				Stadium: Croatian Sports Centre

2 April	Port Adelaide (4)	1–2	Noarlunga United (4)	Taperoo
19:30				Stadium: Ngarrpadla Josie Agius Reserve

2 April	Adelaide Olympic (3)	1–4	Adelaide City (2)	Angle Park
20:30				Stadium: L3 Football Stadium

4 April	Croydon FC (2)	4–1	North Eastern MetroStars (2)	Regency Park
14:30				Stadium: Regency Park

4 April	Salisbury Inter (4)	0–3	Para Hills Knights (2)	Salisbury North
15:00				Stadium: Underdown Park

4 April	Modbury Jets (3)	2–0	Eastern United (3)	Ridgehaven
15:00				Stadium: Smith Partners Stadium

4 April	Whyalla Lions (5)	1–4	West Adelaide (2)	Whyalla
15:00				Stadium: Worsnop Park

== Third round ==
The third round of the Federation Cup was also the fifth round of the 2026 Australia Cup preliminary rounds.

Number of teams per tier still in competition
NPL SA (2)	State League 1 (3)	State League 2 (4)	Regional (5)	Amateur (-)	Total
8 / 11	5 / 12	3 / 20	0 / 5	0 / 10	16 / 58

24 April	Croydon FC (2)	1–3	Adelaide Omonia Cobras (3)	Regency Park
20:00	Kato 70'	Report	Harpas 31', 82'; Williams 46'	Stadium: Regency Park; Referee: Mark Michael

24 April	Gawler Eagles (4)	1–4	Adelaide City (2)	Evanston Gardens
20:30	Corbo 74' (o.g.)	Report	Costanzo 13'; Abetew 23'; Bressan 34'; Kasumovic 45+2'	Stadium: Karbeethan Reserve; Referee: Andrew Kite

25 April	Pontian Eagles (4)	4–5	West Torrens Birkalla (2)	Paralowie
15:00	G. Katsigiannis 3', 90+5'; M. Turay 49'; J. Spokeyjack 61'	Report	D. Klassen-Thomas 13'; T. Conway 41'; T. Tsarkani 53', 75'; B. Everett 88'	Stadium: Terry Kalaitsidis Park; Referee: Mon Bahadur Khadka

25 April	Cumberland United (3)	6–0	Noarlunga United (4)	Clarence Gardens
15:00	A. Balamba 18'; C. Shearer 26'; A. Ekeland 33'; D. Bergamin 63'; T. Scott 86'; H. Wellington 89'			Stadium: Lady Burra Stadium; Referee: Alexander Diamond

25 April	Modbury Jets (3)	0–0 (a.e.t.) (5–6 p)	Adelaide Atletico (3)	Ridgehaven
15:00		Report		Stadium: Smith Partners Stadium; Referee: Denis Palushaj

25 April	Para Hills Knights (2)	2–0	Sturt Lions (2)	Para Hills West
15:00	S. Siyani 38'; M. Guerrera 39'	Report		Stadium: Cass & Co Stadium - The Paddocks; Referee: Curtis Wordsworth

25 April	Fulham United (3)	5–3 (a.e.t.)	Adelaide Comets (2)	West Beach
15:00	R. Aunger 16'; R. Caruso 22'; C. Centofani 33'; C. Hayes 111' (o.g.); V. Scalzi 115'	Report	J. Dorsi 2'; G. Gomwikezwa 14', 55'	Stadium: West Beach Parks; Referee: Tom Brinkworth

25 April	West Adelaide (2)	0–3	FK Beograd (2)	Kilburn
16:00		Report	L. Boselli 55'; A. Trimboli 78'; P. Palasis 90'	Stadium: Kilburn Sportsplex; Referee: Dion Turner

== Quarter-finals ==
The quarter-finals of the Federation Cup were also the sixth round of the 2026 Australia Cup preliminary rounds.

Number of teams per tier still in competition
NPL SA (2)	State League 1 (3)	State League 2 (4)	Regional (5)	Amateur (-)	Total
4 / 11	4 / 12	0 / 20	0 / 5	0 / 10	8 / 58

12 May	Para Hills Knights (2)	2–4	Adelaide Omonia Cobras (3)	Para Hills West
19:00	M. Guerrera 54', 56'	Report	B. Glushkov 8', 90'; N. Harpas 23', 77'	Stadium: Cass & Co Stadium - The Paddocks

12 May	Cumberland United (3)	1–0	Adelaide City (2)	Clarence Gardens
19:30	H. Rimington 25'	Report		Stadium: Lady Burra Stadium

12 May	Adelaide Atletico (3)	0–1	FK Beograd (2)	Newton
20:00		Report	D. Atkinson 34'	Stadium: Steve Woodcock Sports Centre

19 May	Fulham United (3)	3–5 (a.e.t.)	West Torrens Birkalla (2)	West Beach
18:45	L. Fusco 41'; R. Caruso 77'; R. Aunger 84'	Report	D. Klassen-Thomas 48', 60'; B. Everett 82'; A. Welsh 93', 103'	Stadium: West Beach Parks; Referee: Jayden Betterman

== Semi-finals ==
The semi-finals of the Federation Cup were also the seventh round of the 2026 Australia Cup preliminary rounds.

Number of teams per tier still in competition
NPL SA (2)	State League 1 (3)	State League 2 (4)	Regional (5)	Amateur (-)	Total
2 / 11	2 / 12	0 / 20	0 / 5	0 / 10	4 / 58

10 June	Cumberland United (3)	3–2	Adelaide Omonia Cobras (3)	Gepps Cross
19:15	H. Rimington 21', 59'; D. Min 69'	Report	N. Harpas 29'; A. Williams 51'	Stadium: ServiceFM Stadium; Referee: Christian Verdicchio

17 June	FK Beograd (2)	3–0	West Torrens Birkalla (2)	Gepps Cross
19:15	Niyonkuru 37'; Atkinson 38'; Centofanti 75'	Report		Stadium: ServiceFM Stadium; Referee: Daniel Cook

== Final ==
12 July
16:00

FK Beograd (2)	5–2 (a.e.t.)	Cumberland United (3)
Hussein 34'; Nastiopolis 64'; Trimboli 91', 107'; Atkinson 101'	Report	Dutton 12'; LoBasso 60'

ServiceFM Stadium, Gepps Cross
Referee: Tom Brinkworth

== See also ==
- 2026 Football South Australia season
