= Football SA Federation Cup =

- Organiser(s): Football South Australia
- Founded: July 1907; 119 years ago
- Region: South Australia
- Teams: 57 (2025)
- Qualifier for: Australia Cup
- Current champions: FK Beograd (6th title)
- Most championships: Adelaide City (18 titles)
- Broadcaster(s): YouTube (Semi-finals and final only)
- Website: Football SA
- 2026 FSA Federation Cup

The Football South Australia Federation Cup, more commonly known as the Federation Cup and referred to as the Australia Cup South Australian preliminary rounds until the semi-finals, is an annual knockout cup competition in South Australia, run by the state's governing body, Football South Australia. The competition is the second longest-running cup competition in the country, only behind the Football West State Cup, first contested eight years earlier. The competition includes all clubs from the top three tiers of South Australian soccer, as well as numerous clubs from level four and outside the pyramid.

Since 2014, the Federation Cup has been incorporated as one of the qualification tournaments to determine participants in the national Australia Cup. Initially, only the winner would qualify, but since 2020, both finalists advance. Adelaide City are the most successful club in the competitions history, winning the competition a total of 18 times, including a run of five in a row from 1969 through to 1973. FK Beograd are the current champions, winning their first major trophy in 21 years, and their sixth title in the 2026 final, defeating Cumberland United 5–2.

== History ==
In July 1907, the Webb-Harris Cup was presented by Messrs. Charles Webb and J Harris as an annual competition with the stipulation that the first team to win the tournament three times would become the outright winners. The first edition consisted of six teams: Cambridge, North Adelaide, Norwood, Port Adelaide, South Adelaide and West Adelaide, and was won by Cambridge, who defeated Hindmarsh 2–0 in the inaugural final. Hindmarsh won the 1908 and 1909 finals, defeating Port Adelaide and Sturt, and Cambridge won the 1910 and 1911 finals, becoming outright winners in the competition's fifth year. After becoming the permanent owners of the trophy, the Cambridge club presented it to the South Australian British Football Association for it to be contested perpetually and to be known as the Cambridge Cup.

From 1926 until 1954, the cup was presented by Victorian clothing brand Pelaco, as the Cambridge club had folded years prior. In 1955, South Australian tabloid newspaper The Advertiser took over presentation rights. In 1961, eight clubs broke away from the federation and contested their own version of the cup, known as the Jaxen Cup. Following the reamalgamation of the South Australian Soccer Federation, the cup was renamed as the Federation Cup, and has since had different sponsors, including Willis, P.G.H., Dairy Vale, Mutual Community, West End, Best Pavers, Top Corner and Coca-Cola.

Since 2014, the competition has also decided the South Australian representatives in the Australia Cup. Adelaide City qualified for the inaugural season of the competition after defeating rivals West Adelaide 4–1 in the final. Since 2020, the two finalists have qualified for the Australia Cup after South Australia earned a second slot due to an increase in preliminary round participants.

== Format ==
The competition is a single-elimination tournament. Depending on the number of teams that enter the competition, it may begin from various stages. The first round of the competition includes all teams excluding the 11 eligible National Premier Leagues South Australia teams, unless necessary. The teams who are drawn last receive byes to the second round. All teams play from the second round onwards. The semi-final and final are played at a neutral venue, as decided by Football South Australia.

The 2025 competition began from the 2025 Australia Cup third preliminary round, with 57 teams participating, and the 11 eligible National Premier Leagues South Australia teams entering in the following round.

2025 Format
Federation Cup	Australia Cup	No. of teams
First round	Third preliminary round	57
Second round	Fourth preliminary round	32
Third round	Fifth preliminary round	16
Quarter-finals	Sixth preliminary round	8
Semi-finals	Seventh preliminary round	4
Final	—	2

== Eligible teams ==
All Football South Australia affiliate clubs are required to participate in the competition. Teams outside of FSA competitions may apply to enter. Adelaide United Youth are ineligible to participate, as youth teams cannot play in the Australia Cup preliminary rounds.

Football South Australia affiliate clubs

- National Premier Leagues South Australia
- State League 1 South Australia
- State League 2 South Australia

Non-affiliate clubs

- South Australian Regional Leagues
- South Australian Amateur Soccer League

== Venues ==
All matches are played at the venue of the home team, who is always the team that is drawn first. The semi-finals and final are played on a neutral ground, which since 2022, has been the State Centre for Football. Excluding 2015 and 2021, which used The Parks Football Centre as the neutral venue, the cup final was historically played at Hindmarsh Stadium.

From 2025 onwards, if a Football South Australia affiliate club is drawn against a non-affiliate club, the latter will host the fixture, unless the match is to be played at a neutral venue.

== List of finals ==
No.	Year	Cup Name	Date	Winner(s)	Score	Runner-up	Venue
1	1907	Webb-Harris	24 August	Cambridge	2–0	Hindmarsh	Hindmarsh Oval
2	1908	Webb-Harris	15 August	Hindmarsh	4–1	Port Adelaide	Hindmarsh Oval
3	1909	Webb-Harris	28 August	Hindmarsh	4–1	Sturt	Hindmarsh Oval
4	1910	Webb-Harris	8 October	Cambridge		South Adelaide	Forestville
5	1911	Webb-Harris	12 August	Cambridge	2–0	Port Adelaide	Alberton Oval
6	1912	Cambridge	7 September	Adelaide	2–1	Tandanya	Jubilee Oval
7	1913	Cambridge	6 September	Adelaide	3–0	Hindmarsh	Hindmarsh Oval
8	1914	Cambridge	19 September	Adelaide	2–1	Hindmarsh	Hindmarsh Oval
9	1915	Cambridge	4 September	Hindmarsh	4–1	Cheltenham	Park 18
	1916–18	No competition due to World War I					
10	1919	Cambridge	23 August	Hindmarsh; Sturt (Note: Hindmarsh and Sturt shared the cup in 1919, with both teams holding it for 6 months each, as they were unable to organise a replay.)	1–1	—	Hindmarsh Oval
11	1920	Cambridge	4 September	Cheltenham	2–1	South Adelaide	Hawthorn Oval
12	1921	Cambridge	17 September	South Adelaide	3–2	Cheltenham	Hindmarsh Oval
13	1922	Cambridge	16 September	Cheltenham	1–0	Sturt	Kensington Oval
14	1923	Cambridge	13 October	Prospect	2–1 (rep.)	South Adelaide	Jubilee Oval
15	1924	Cambridge	18 October	Holdens United	1–0 (a.e.t.)	Prospect	Camden Oval
16	1925	Cambridge	19 September	West Torrens	3–1	Sturt	Jubilee Oval
17	1926	Pelaco	25 September	Port Adelaide	2–1	Sturt	Jubilee Oval
18	1927	Pelaco	1 October	West Torrens	4–3	West Adelaide	Hindmarsh Oval
19	1928	Pelaco	15 September	West Torrens	2–1	West United	Hindmarsh Oval
20	1929	Pelaco	14 September	West Torrens	3–2	Railways	Mortlock Park
21	1930	Pelaco	13 September	Railways	3–2 (a.e.t.)	Port Adelaide	Hindmarsh Oval
22	1931	Pelaco	3 October	Lancashire	4–2 (rep.)	Port Adelaide	Hindmarsh Oval
23	1932	Pelaco	1 October	Lancashire	2–0	Railways	Jubilee Oval
24	1933	Pelaco	16 September	Port Adelaide	2–1	West Torrens	Hart Street Reserve
25	1934	Pelaco	15 September	Port Thistle	3–2	West Torrens	Hindmarsh Oval
26	1935	Pelaco	14 September	Kingswood	4–2	Port Thistle	Hindmarsh Oval
27	1936	Pelaco	12 September	Sturt	4–2	Port Adelaide	Hindmarsh Oval
28	1937	Pelaco	11 September	Sturt	3–2	Port Thistle	Hindmarsh Oval
29	1938	Pelaco	24 September	Birkalla Rovers	2–0	Kingswood	Hindmarsh Oval
30	1939	Pelaco	30 September	West Torrens	2–0	Birkalla Rovers	Hindmarsh Oval
31	1940	Pelaco	28 September	West Torrens	5–1	South Adelaide	Hindmarsh Oval
32	1941	Pelaco	27 September	Sturt	3–1	Birkalla Rovers	Hindmarsh Oval
	1942	No competition due to World War II					
33	1943	Pelaco	25 September	Northumberland & Durham	2–1	British Tube Mills	Mortlock Park
34	1944	Pelaco	16 September	Birkalla Rovers	2–1	Northumberland & Durham	Allenby Gardens Reserve
35	1945	Pelaco	29 September	Port Adelaide	3–2	Birkalla Rovers	Allenby Gardens Reserve
36	1946	Pelaco	28 September	West Torrens	4–3	Kingswood	Railway Oval
	1947–49	Not held					
38	1950	Pelaco	7 October	Birkalla Rovers	4–1	Port Adelaide	Mortlock Park
39	1951	Pelaco	29 September	Birkalla Rovers	1–0	Juventus	Mortlock Park
40	1952	Pelaco	27 September	Polonia Adelaide	3–1	Beograd Woodville	Norwood Oval
41	1953	Pelaco	3 October	Juventus	4–3	Prospect United	Alberton Oval
42	1954	Pelaco	9 October	Polonia Adelaide	3–1	Juventus	Mortlock Park
43	1955	The Advertiser		Juventus	2–1	Polonia Adelaide	
44	1956	The Advertiser	29 September	USC Lion	3–2	Cumberland United	Kensington Oval
45	1957	The Advertiser		Juventus	5–1	USC Lion	
46	1958	The Advertiser	27 September	Juventus	1–0	Polonia Adelaide	
47	1959	The Advertiser		Juventus	1–0	Adelaide Croatia	Norwood Oval
48	1960	The Advertiser		Adelaide Croatia	4–0	Cumberland United	Hindmarsh Stadium
49	1961	The Advertiser (SASFA); Jaxen (SASL)	7 October (SASFA); 30 September (SASL)	Victoria (SASFA); USC Lion (SASL)	2–1; 3–2	Enfield City (SASFA); Orange (SASL)	
50	1962	Federation		Adelaide Croatia	2–1	Burnside Budapest	
51	1963	Federation	14 September	Adelaide Juventus	5–1	West Adelaide Hellas	
52	1964	Federation	24 October	West Adelaide Hellas	6–2 (rep.)	Polonia Adelaide	
53	1965	Federation	25 September	Adelaide Juventus	1–0 (a.e.t.)	Enfield City	Olympic Sports Field
54	1966	Federation	24 September	Polonia Adelaide	1–0	Victoria	Hindmarsh Stadium
55	1967	Federation	23 September	West Adelaide Hellas	3–0	Adelaide Juventus	Hindmarsh Stadium
56	1968	Federation	28 September	Polonia Adelaide	2–1 (a.e.t.)	Adelaide Juventus	Hindmarsh Stadium
57	1969	Federation	20 September	Adelaide Juventus	4–1	USC Lion	Hindmarsh Stadium
58	1970	Federation	29 August	Adelaide Juventus	3–2	West Adelaide Hellas	Hindmarsh Stadium
59	1971	Federation	18 September	Adelaide Juventus	1–0	West Adelaide Hellas	Hindmarsh Stadium
60	1972	Federation	2 September	Adelaide Juventus	2–0	West Adelaide Hellas	Hindmarsh Stadium
61	1973	Willis	1 September	Adelaide Juventus	1–0	West Adelaide Hellas	Hindmarsh Stadium
62	1974	Willis	7 September	Adelaide Croatia	4–3	Cumberland United	Hindmarsh Stadium
63	1975	Willis	6 September	Polonia Adelaide	2–0	USC Lion	Hindmarsh Stadium
64	1976	Willis	18 September	Adelaide Juventus	4–0	Campbelltown City	Hindmarsh Stadium
65	1977	Willis	3 September	Adelaide Croatia	1–0	Campbelltown Budapest	Hindmarsh Stadium
66	1978	Federation	2 September	Cumberland United	3–0	Campbelltown Budapest	Hindmarsh Stadium
67	1979	Federation	9 September	Port Adelaide	2–0	Eastern Districts Azzurri	Hindmarsh Stadium
68	1980	Federation	27 September	Beograd Woodville	4–0	Enfield Victoria	Hindmarsh Stadium
69	1981	Federation		Eastern Districts Azzurri	3–0	Polonia Adelaide	Hindmarsh Stadium
70	1982	Federation		Adelaide Croatia	2–1 (a.e.t.)	Para Hills	Hindmarsh Stadium
71	1983	P.G.H.	17 September	Beograd Woodville	1–0	Salisbury United	Hindmarsh Stadium
72	1984	P.G.H.		Eastern Districts Azzurri	2–1 (a.e.t.)	Campbelltown City	Hindmarsh Stadium
73	1985	P.G.H.	7 September	Campbelltown City	3–2 (rep.)	Cumberland United	Hindmarsh Stadium
74	1986	P.G.H.	6 September	Eastern Districts Azzurri	0–0 (5–4 (p))	Para Hills	Hindmarsh Stadium
75	1987	P.G.H.	5 September	West Torrens Birkalla	1–0	Campbelltown City	Hindmarsh Stadium
76	1988	P.G.H.		Adelaide Croatia	3–2	Polonia Adelaide	Hindmarsh Stadium
77	1989	P.G.H.	2 September	Modbury Jets	2–0	Para Hills	Hindmarsh Stadium
78	1990	P.G.H.	31 August	Adelaide Croatia	4–2	West Adelaide Hellas	Hindmarsh Stadium
79	1991	P.G.H.		Adelaide Croatia	1–0	Salisbury United	
80	1992	Federation		Adelaide Croatia	3–1	Eastern Districts Azzurri	
81	1993	Federation		White City Woodville	1–0	Olympians	
82	1994	Dairy Vale		Campbelltown City	3–0	Salisbury United	
83	1995	Dairy Vale		Adelaide Blue Eagles	4–2 (a.e.t.) (rep.)	Port Adelaide Lion	
84	1996	Mutual Community	6 July	White City Woodville	3–0	Croydon Kings	
85	1997	Mutual Community	9 June	Adelaide Blue Eagles	2–1	West Torrens Birkalla	Thebarton Oval
86	1998	Mutual Community	7 June	Adelaide Blue Eagles	3–1	Adelaide Raiders	Hindmarsh Stadium
87	1999	West End	17 October	West Adelaide	2–1	Elizabeth City	Hindmarsh Stadium
88	2000	West End	22 July	Croydon Kings	1–1 (7–6 (p))	North Eastern MetroStars	Marden Sports Complex
89	2001	West End	1 September	Playford City Patriots	3–0	Adelaide Blue Eagles	Hindmarsh Stadium
90	2002	West End	26 June	Adelaide Galaxy	3–0	Croydon Kings	Hindmarsh Stadium
91	2003	Federation	5 July	Adelaide Raiders	5–2	North Eastern MetroStars	Hindmarsh Stadium
92	2004	Federation	2 October	North Eastern MetroStars	5–2	Modbury Jets	Hindmarsh Stadium
93	2005	Federation	20 August	White City Woodville	2–1 (a.e.t.)	Adelaide Raiders	Hindmarsh Stadium
94	2006	Federation	24 September	Adelaide City	4–1	Adelaide Blue Eagles	Hindmarsh Stadium
95	2007	Best Pavers	25 August	Adelaide City	1–0	North Eastern MetroStars	Hindmarsh Stadium
96	2008	Best Pavers	23 August	North Eastern MetroStars	1–0	Adelaide City	Hindmarsh Stadium
97	2009	Top Corner	15 August	Cumberland United	0–0 (5–4 (p))	Campbelltown City	Hindmarsh Stadium
98	2010	Federation	21 August	Adelaide Blue Eagles	3–2	North Eastern MetroStars	Hindmarsh Stadium
99	2011	Coca-Cola	20 August	Western Strikers	1–1 (6–5 (p))	Adelaide Blue Eagles	Hindmarsh Stadium
100	2012	Coca-Cola	25 August	North Eastern MetroStars	3–1	Para Hills Knights	Hindmarsh Stadium
101	2013	Coca-Cola	10 August	Adelaide City	1–1 (5–4 (p)	White City Woodville	Hindmarsh Stadium
102	2014	Coca-Cola	31 June	Adelaide City	4–1	West Adelaide	Hindmarsh Stadium
103	2015	Federation	28 June	Croydon Kings	2–0	Adelaide City	The Parks Football Centre
104	2016	Federation	25 June	North Eastern MetroStars	1–0	Adelaide Comets	Hindmarsh Stadium
105	2017	Federation	24 June	North Eastern MetroStars	2–0	Adelaide City	Hindmarsh Stadium
106	2018	Federation	11 June	Adelaide Comets	2–1	Croydon Kings	Hindmarsh Stadium
107	2019	Federation	22 June	Adelaide Olympic	3–2	Adelaide City	Hindmarsh Stadium
	2020	Not held due to the COVID-19 pandemic in Australia					
108	2021	Federation	14 July	Adelaide Olympic	2–1	Adelaide City	The Parks Football Centre
109	2022	Federation	16 July	Adelaide City	5–0	Modbury Jets	State Centre for Football
110	2023	Federation	24 June	North Eastern MetroStars	3–2 (a.e.t.)	Campbelltown City	State Centre for Football
111	2024	Federation	6 July	Campbelltown City	3–0	Modbury Jets	State Centre for Football
112	2025	Federation	12 July	North Eastern MetroStars	3–1	Adelaide Croatia Raiders	State Centre for Football
113	2026	Federation	12 July	FK Beograd	5–2 (a.e.t.)	Cumberland United	State Centre for Football

== Statistics ==
=== Teams ===
Most successful teams
Rank	Team	Wins	Last
1	Adelaide City	18	2022
2	Adelaide Croatia Raiders	10	2003
3	Adelaide Blue Eagles	7	2010
3	West Torrens	7	1946
3	North Eastern MetroStars	7	2025
6	Croydon FC	6	2015
6	West Torrens Birkalla	6	2002
6	FK Beograd	6	2026
9	Hindmarsh	4	1919
9	Port Adelaide	4	1979
9	Sturt-Orange	4	1941

Most finals appearances
Rank	Team	Apps	Last
1	Adelaide City	27	2022
2	Croydon FC	15	2018
3	Adelaide Croatia Raiders	14	2025
4	Adelaide Blue Eagles	12	2011
4	Port Adelaide	12	1995
6	North Eastern MetroStars	11	2025
7	Campbelltown City	10	2024
7	West Adelaide	10	2014
7	West Torrens Birkalla	10	2002
10	Sturt-Orange	9	1941

=== Venue ===
Finals hosted
Rank	Venue	No.	Last
1	Hindmarsh Stadium (Note: Includes Hindmarsh Oval.)	65	2019
2	Jubilee Oval	5	1932
2	Mortlock Park	5	1954
2	State Centre for Football	5	2026
5	Olympic Sports Field (Note: Includes Kensington Oval.)	3	1965
6	Alberton Oval	2	1953
6	Allenby Gardens Reserve	2	1945
6	Norwood Oval	2	1959
6	The Parks Football Centre	2	2021
Unknown		14	
