= The Gap FC =

The Gap Football Club
- Full name: The Gap Football Club
- Nickname: The Gators
- Founded: 1955
- Ground: Walton Bridge Reserve, The Gap
- League: FQLD 4 -Metro
- 2023: 10th of 12
- Website: www.gapfootball.org.au

The Gap Football Club is an Australian soccer club from The Gap, a suburb of Brisbane. The club was formed in 1955, and currently competes in Football Queensland Premier League Metro 4. The club's distinctive gold and purple colours have been with the club since its earliest days and derive from the name of the suburb (GAP – Gold and Purple).

== History ==
The Gap Pastime Club was formed on 17 February 1955 as a multi-sports club with the main focus in its early years on cricket, soccer and softball. The club initially played its soccer at Jubilee Park, Bardon before moving to its current home, the Walton Bridge Reserve in 1959.

The Gap FC rose through the lower divisions in its early years, then spent a decade in Division 2 after winning promotion from the Third Division in 1966. During this period, The Gap reached the quarter-finals of the 1974 Ampol Cup, the only time to date it has advanced this far in a Brisbane senior cup competition. Following relegation in 1976, The Gap has mostly competed at the second and third level of the Brisbane football system. The Gap FC spent two seasons in the Brisbane Premier League in 2002 and 2003 after winning a promotion play-off against Pine Rivers United in 2001.

In 2016 The Gap FC were premiers of Capital League 2 resulting in promotion to Capital League 1, in the process achieving a first team club record of 92 goals in the regular season. After the creation of the Football Queensland Premier League, The Gap was moved up to the Brisbane Premier League for the 2018 season and made the final series after finishing in fourth place.

== Recent Seasons ==
Season	League											FFA Cup
Season	Division (tier)	Pld	W	D	L	GF	GA	GD	Pts	Position	Finals Series	FFA Cup
1973	Division 2 (2)	21	9	5	7	35	27	8	23	6th	DNQ	Not yet founded
1974	Division 2 (2)	22	8	4	10	30	40	−10	20	8th	DNQ	Not yet founded
1975	Division 2 (2)	21	9	3	9	34	44	−10	21	8th	DNQ	Not yet founded
1976	Division 2 (2)	22	3	4	15	13	51	−38	10	12th ↓	DNQ	Not yet founded
1977	Division 3 (4)	22	10	4	8	36	28	8	24	5th	DNQ	Not yet founded
1978	Division 3 (4)	22	5	3	14	28	39	−11	13	9th	DNQ	Not yet founded
1979	Division 2 (4)	22	6	6	10	24	31	−7	18	9th	DNQ	Not yet founded
1980	Division 2 (4)	22	8	4	10	35	35	0	20	7th	DNQ	Not yet founded
1981	Division 2 (4)	22	8	5	9	33	35	−2	21	6th	DNQ	Not yet founded
1982	Division 2 (4)	22	7	9	6	27	27	0	23	7th	DNQ	Not yet founded
1983	Division 2 (4)	22	7	5	10	32	36	−4	19	8th	DNQ	Not yet founded
1984	Amateur Division 1 (4)	22	6	4	12	25	43	−18	16	11th ↓	DNQ	Not yet founded
1985	Amateur Division 2 (5)	22	13	6	3	66	14	52	32	3rd	?	Not yet founded
1986	Amateur Division 2 (5)	22	19	1	2	60	16	44	39	1st	Champions	Not yet founded
1987	Division 3 (4)	22	12	9	1	38	17	21	33	1st ↑	Champions	Not yet founded
1988	Division 2 (3)	22	7	4	11	27	34	-7	25	10th	DNQ	Not yet founded
1989	Division 2 (3)	22	7	4	11	22	40	-18	25	8th	DNQ	Not yet founded
1990	Division 2 (3)	22	7	7	8	16	18	-2	28	7th	DNQ	Not yet founded
1991	Division 2 (3)	22	11	2	9	26	27	-1	35	5th	DNQ	Not yet founded
1992	Division 2 (3)	22	6	5	11	35	53	-18	23	9th	DNQ	Not yet founded
1993	Division 2 (3)	22	9	3	10	33	40	-7	30	7th	DNQ	Not yet founded
1994	Division 2 (3)	22	1	5	16	21	63	-42	8	12th ↓	DNQ	Not yet founded
1995	Division 3 (4)	22	13	4	5	46	25	21	43	3rd ↑	Preliminary Final	Not yet founded
1996	Division 2 (3)	22	9	4	9	36	42	-6	31	7th	DNQ	Not yet founded
1997	Division 1 North (3)	18	4	6	8	32	41	−9	18	9th	DNQ	Not yet founded
1998	Division 1 North (3)	24	8	4	12	41	48	−7	28	6th	DNQ	Not yet founded
1999	Division 1 North (3)	24	6	5	13	41	59	−18	23	7th	DNQ	Not yet founded
2000	Division 1 North (3)	24	11	2	11	50	43	7	35	5th	DNQ	Not yet founded
2001	Semi Pro Division (3)	26	17	4	5	57	24	33	55	2nd ↑	Preliminary Final	Not yet founded
2002	Brisbane Premier League (2)	22	4	8	10	25	49	−24	20	8th	DNQ	Not yet founded
2003	Brisbane Premier League (2)	22	2	4	16	16	50	−34	10	12th ↓	DNQ	Not yet founded
2004	Premier Division 1 (3)	22	2	10	10	29	45	−16	16	10th	DNQ	Not yet founded
2005	Premier Division 1 (3)	22	3	3	16	26	63	−37	12	11th ↓	DNQ	Not yet founded
2006	Premier Division 2 (4)	22	5	6	11	42	57	−15	21	10th	DNQ	Not yet founded
2007	Premier Division 2 (4)	22	4	5	13	31	55	−24	17	11th	DNQ	Not yet founded
2008	Premier Division 2 (4)	22	14	1	7	67	36	31	43	2nd ↑	Semi-final	Not yet founded
2009	Premier Division 1 (3)	22	5	6	11	32	49	−17	21	10th	DNQ	Not yet founded
2010	Premier Division 1 (3)	26	2	4	20	39	86	−47	10	13th ↓	DNQ	Not yet founded
2011	Premier Division 2 (4)	26	12	5	9	58	52	6	41	5th	Qualifying Final	Not yet founded
2012	Premier Division 2 (4)	22	11	2	9	52	36	16	35	6th	DNQ	Not yet founded
2013	Capital League 2 (5)	22	13	2	7	52	49	3	41	3rd	Champions	Not yet founded
2014	Capital League 2 (5)	22	13	1	8	45	38	7	40	6th	DNQ	Preliminary Round 3
2015	Capital League 2 (5)	22	9	0	13	42	60	−18	27	8th	DNQ	Preliminary Round 4
2016	Capital League 2 (5)	22	18	2	2	92	19	73	56	1st ↑	Runners-up	Preliminary Round 3
2017	Capital League 1 (4)	22	10	2	10	39	48	−9	32	8th	DNQ	Preliminary Round 4
2018	Brisbane Premier League (4)	22	11	3	8	35	35	0	36	4th	Preliminary Final	Preliminary Round 3
2019	Brisbane Premier League (4)	22	9	5	8	54	52	2	32	6th	DNQ	Preliminary Round 2
2020	Brisbane Premier League (4)	16	3	2	11	24	45	-21	11	11th	DNQ	Preliminary Round 3
2021	Brisbane Premier League (4)	22	4	5	13	19	44	-25	17	10th	DNQ	Preliminary Round 3
2022	FQPL 3 Metro (4)	22	4	2	16	34	71	-37	14	12th ↓	DNQ	Preliminary Round 3
2023	FQPL 4 Metro (5)	22	4	2	16	37	61	-24	14	10th	DNQ	Preliminary Round 4
2024	FQPL 4 Metro (5)	22	13	4	5	68	35	33	43	3rd	Semi-final	Preliminary Round 5
2025	FQPL 4 Metro (5)	22	9	3	10	64	53	11	30	6th	DNQ	Preliminary Round 4
2026	FQPL 4 Metro (5)	22	1	1	20	23	113	-90	4	12th ↓	DNQ	Preliminary Round 3

Key:	Premiers / Champions	Promoted ↑	Relegated ↓

The tier is the level in the Australian soccer league system

== Honours ==
- Brisbane Division 3 – Premiers 1966
- Brisbane Division 2 – Premiers and Champions 1986
- Brisbane Division 3 – Premiers and Champions 1987
- Capital League 2 – Champions 2013
- Capital League 2 – Premiers 2016
