= 2023 in Queensland soccer =

Football Queensland
- Season: 2023

The 2023 Football Queensland season was the 11th season since NPL Queensland commenced as the highest-ranking level of Queensland men's football. The 2023 season was also the sixth season of the Football Queensland Premier League and the third season of the Football Queensland Premier League 2, representing the second and third tiers of Queensland men's football respectively.

== Men's League Tables ==
=== 2023 National Premier Leagues Queensland ===
NPL Queensland
- Season: 2023
- Dates: 24 February-17 September

The 2023 National Premier Leagues Queensland season was the 11th season of first division football in Queensland under the National Premier Leagues banner. The season ran from 24 February to 26 August, as a double round-robin over 22 rounds, followed by a finals series. The final series was amended to include six teams in order to provide an equitable outcomes to all clubs. This followed the provision of inadvertent advice and a subsequent determination from Football Queensland in relation to a disciplinary matter and player eligibility.

==== League table ====
Pos	Team	Pld	W	D	L	GF	GA	GD	Pts	Qualification or relegation
1	Gold Coast Knights (C)	22	14	6	2	45	21	+24	48	2023 NPL Queensland Finals
2	Moreton Bay United	22	11	5	6	45	27	+18	38	2023 NPL Queensland Finals
3	Gold Coast United	22	10	6	6	27	23	+4	36	2023 NPL Queensland Finals
4	Brisbane City	22	10	5	7	46	30	+16	35	2023 NPL Queensland Finals
5	Lions FC	22	8	10	4	37	29	+8	34	2023 NPL Queensland Finals
6	Peninsula Power	22	9	7	6	34	30	+4	34	2023 NPL Queensland Finals
7	Rochedale Rovers	22	9	3	10	32	30	+2	30	
8	Sunshine Coast Wanderers	22	8	5	9	26	34	−8	29	
9	Brisbane Roar Youth	22	8	3	11	29	37	−8	27	
10	Redlands United	22	7	5	10	32	33	−1	26	
11	Olympic FC	22	5	4	13	28	39	−11	19	
12	Eastern Suburbs (R)	22	2	3	17	22	70	−48	9	Relegation to 2024 FQPL 1

Source: squadi
Rules for classification: 1) points; 2) goal difference; 3) number of goals scored.
(C) Champions; (R) Relegated

==== Finals ====
Elimination final
3	Gold Coast United	1
6	Peninsula Power	3
4	Brisbane City	2
5	Lions FC	1

Semi-finals
1	Gold Coast Knights	5
6	Peninsula Power	0
2	Moreton Bay United	2
4	Brisbane City	1

Grand final
1	Gold Coast Knights	1
2	Moreton Bay United	0

=== 2023 Football Queensland Premier League 1 ===
Football Queensland Premier League 1
- Season: 2023

The 2023 Football Queensland Premier League 1 season was the sixth season of second division football in Queensland under the Football Queensland Premier League banner. The season ran from 24 February to 26 August, as a double round-robin over 22 rounds, followed by a finals series.

==== League table ====
Pos	Team	Pld	W	D	L	GF	GA	GD	Pts	Qualification or relegation
1	Surfers Paradise Apollo (C)	22	16	4	2	63	23	+40	52	FQPL3 South Coast in 2024, 2023 FQPL Finals
2	Wynnum Wolves (P)	22	14	6	2	46	23	+23	48	Promoted to 2024 NPL, 2023 FQPL Finals
3	Logan Lightning	22	12	7	3	39	31	+8	43	2023 FQPL Finals
4	Brisbane Strikers	22	10	4	8	43	37	+6	34	2023 FQPL Finals
5	Western Pride	22	9	3	10	41	43	−2	30	Merged with Ipswich City to form Ipswich FC in 2024
6	Albany Creek Excelsior	22	8	4	10	32	33	−1	28	Merged with MBU to form Moreton City Excelsior in 2024
7	SWQ Thunder	22	7	6	9	45	37	+8	27	
8	Capalaba	22	6	8	8	45	44	+1	26	
9	Sunshine Coast Fire	22	7	3	12	30	38	−8	24	Excluded from FQPL1 in 2024
10	Southside Eagles	22	6	3	13	35	42	−7	21	
11	Caboolture Sports	22	5	6	11	36	56	−20	21	Reprieved from relegation
12	Mitchelton	22	3	4	15	23	71	−48	13	Reprieved from relegation

Source: squadi
Rules for classification: 1) points; 2) goal difference; 3) number of goals scored.
(C) Champions; (P) Promoted

==== Finals ====
Semi-finals
1	Surfers Paradise Apollo	3
4	Brisbane Strikers	0
2	Wynnum Wolves	3
3	Logan Lightning	2

Grand final
1	Surfers Paradise Apollo	0
2	Wynnum Wolves	1

=== 2023 Football Queensland Premier League 2 ===
Football Queensland Premier League 2
- Season: 2023

The 2023 Football Queensland Premier League 2 season was the third season of third division football in Queensland under the Football Queensland Premier League 2 banner. The season ran from 4 March to 20 August, as a double round-robin over 22 rounds, followed by a finals series.

==== League table ====
Pos	Team	Pld	W	D	L	GF	GA	GD	Pts	Qualification or relegation
1	Broadbeach United (C)	22	19	0	3	75	29	+46	57	Promoted to 2024 FQPL 1, 2023 FQPL Finals
2	St George Willawong (P)	22	14	4	4	51	26	+25	46	Promoted to 2024 FQPL 1, 2023 FQPL Finals
3	Grange Thistle	22	12	6	4	52	38	+14	42	2023 FQPL Finals
4	Magic United	22	12	3	7	52	31	+21	39	2023 FQPL Finals
5	Samford Rangers	22	9	5	8	53	45	+8	32	
6	North Star	22	8	5	9	40	34	+6	29	
7	Taringa Rovers	22	7	6	9	40	45	−5	27	
8	Holland Parks Hawks	22	6	8	8	47	41	+6	26	
9	Ipswich Knights	22	4	8	10	33	48	−15	20	
10	Souths United	22	5	3	14	26	53	−27	18	
11	North Lakes United	22	5	2	15	28	79	−51	17	Reprieved from relegation
12	Maroochydore	22	4	4	14	30	58	−28	16	Reprieved from relegation

Source: squadi
Rules for classification: 1) points; 2) goal difference; 3) number of goals scored.
(C) Champions; (P) Promoted

==== Finals ====
Semi-finals
1	Broadbeach United	0
4	Magic United	2
2	St George Willawong	4
3	Grange Thistle	2

Grand final
4	Magic United	5
2	St George Willawong	1
