= Nerimbera FC =

Association football club in Queensland, Australia

Nerimbera FC
Full name	Nerimbera Football Club
Founded	1910
Ground	Pilbeam Park, Rockhampton
League	Central Queensland Premier League
Coach	Lance Lapthorn

Nerimbera Football Club is a football club that play association football. The club is based in Rockhampton in the suburb of Koongal. The 1st division team competes in the Central Queensland Premier League. The last time the team won the competition was in 2003 where they beat Berserker Bears 4–2 with only 9 players. The trophy they won on this night was the Wesley Hall Cup, which is values at approximately $120,000.

== History ==
Nerimbera is one of the oldest football clubs in Australia, being founded in 1910.

The club was devastated by Cyclone Marcia in 2015 where their clubhouse was destroyed. The roof was lifted off which meant the team could not host home games at their home venue at Pilbeam Park.

The team in recent years has been a young squad. Many came from the winning u/16 grand final team of 2017, who won against bluebirds 4–1. Nerimbera finished in the top four in 2023/2024.
