= Marlin Coast Rangers FC =

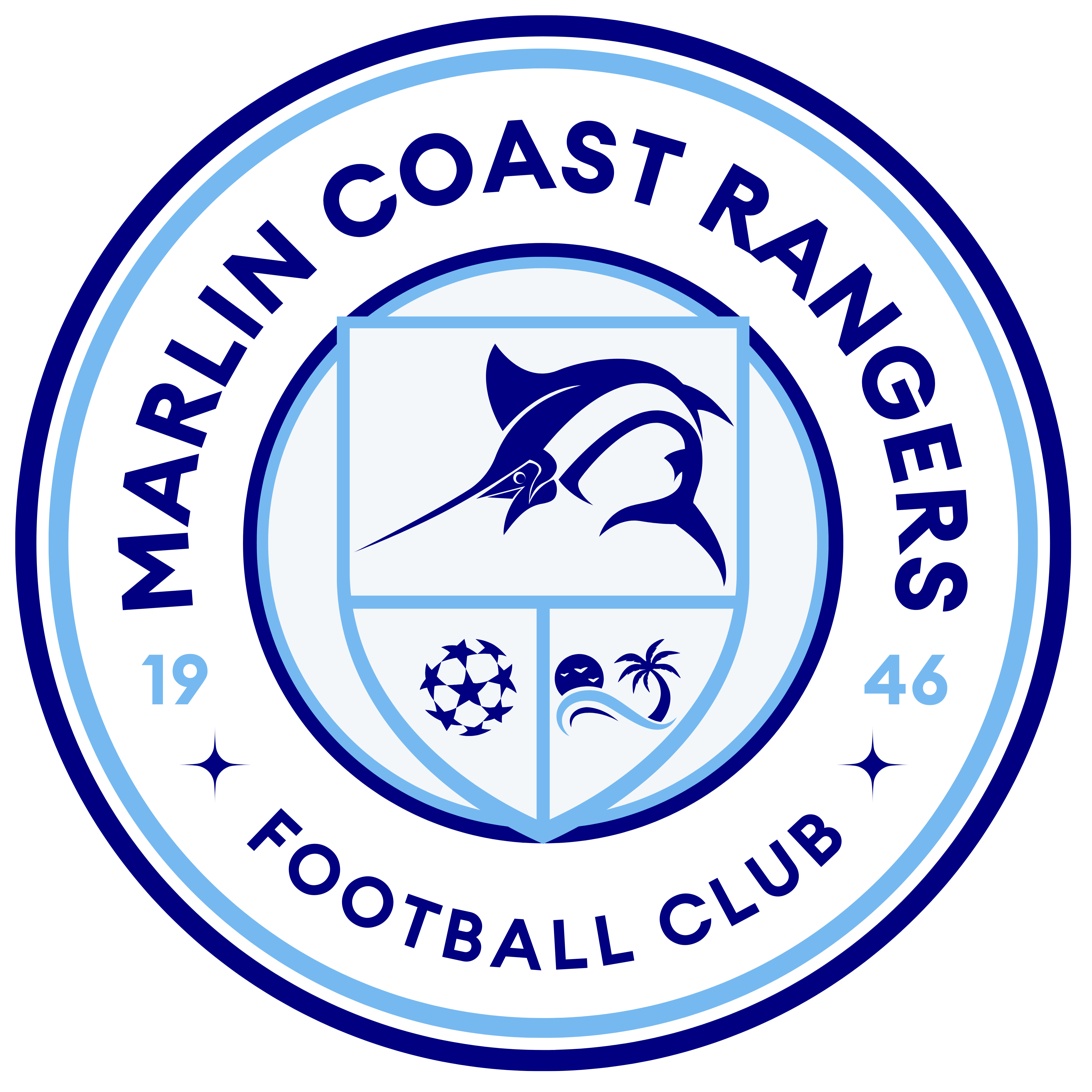
- Full name: Marlin Coast Rangers Football Club
- Nickname: Coast
- Founded: 1946; 80 years ago
- Ground: Pennell Field, Trinity Beach, Far North Queensland
- Head Coach: Crios O'Hare
- League: FQ Far North & Gulf
- Website: https://marlincoastrangersfc.com.au/
Home colours	Away colours

Marlin Coast Rangers Football Club is an amateur soccer club founded in 1946. and based in Cairns, Queensland, Australia. The club play in the regional Football Queensland FQ Far North & Gulf competition, the fifth tier of the Australian soccer league system. Its home ground was officially named Pennell Field in 2010, in honour of Gary Pennell – a respected member of Marlin Coast Rangers Football Club.

The club has won the Football Queensland FQ Far North & Gulf Treble (League, Premiership, Crad Evans Shield) four times in its history (2007, 2010, 2013 and 2024), and also won the League Cup in 1954 and 2022.

The club's Pennell Field grounds regularly play host to the Queensland Schools Football Championships, with the most recent event being the 10–12 years Girls and Boys Football State Championships in 2023.

Current Matildas international player Winonah Heatley played junior football at the Club.

== Pennell Field ==
Pennell Field, located within the Trinity Beach Sporting Precinct on Nautilus Street in Cairns, serves as the home ground of Marlin Coast Rangers FC. Named in honor of Gary Pennell, a long-serving club member and contributor to the club’s development, the facility has become a central hub for football in Far North Queensland.

The ground features four full-size pitches, three of which are equipped with floodlighting for evening matches and training sessions. The layout allows simultaneous training and competitive fixtures, accommodating both junior and senior teams. In addition to the playing surfaces, Pennell Field includes a bar and canteen area, creating a vibrant matchday environment for players, families, and supporters alike.

Over the years, Pennell Field has hosted numerous regional and school competitions, including the Queensland Schools Football Championships, highlighting its role in promoting football at all levels. The precinct has evolved from basic playing fields into a modern, multi-pitch facility with amenities that support both competitive and recreational football, reflecting the club’s long-standing commitment to community engagement and youth development.

== Formation of club and early history ==
The Club was originally formed in 1946 as Northern Australia Brewery (NAB) – and nicknamed Brewery – as one of eight teams in the newly-reformed Cairns Soccer Association League following an 8-year break of football competition in Cairns due to World War 2. The Club's first competitive fixture was a game against Latrobe on 20 April 1947. The Club had a very successful 1954 season, winning the League title. and Diggers' Cup.

In 1973, the Club rebranded itself as Carlton United Brewery (CUB) after a corporate takeover of NAB by the Melbourne-based CUB. CUB Football Club was the first club to be based at Endeavour Park in Cairns, the current Football Queensland headquarters in Cairns.

In 1983, the Club moved to its current Trinity Beach grounds in Nautilus Street and rebranded itself as Marlin Coast Rangers Football Club.

== Recent history ==
On 6 October 2023, former Coast player Cristoir O'Hare – who won the Treble with the club in 2010 and 2013 – was confirmed as the club's new player-coach for the 2024 season.

In O'Hare's first season back at Marlin Coast, the club again won the Treble, after being crowned league champions for the first time in 11 years, and winning their FQPL Grand Final 4-0 against Mareeba, and the Crad Evans Shield with a 5-3 win over MA Olympic in Townsville.

In February 2025, O'Hare scored the fastest goal ever in Australian soccer when he scored from the kick-off after just 3.68 seconds in a 5-0 Australia Cup win over Stratford Dolphins. In June 2025, Marlin Coast hosted Peninsula Power in the Quarter-Finals of the Queensland Cup, just one win away from the national stage and the furthest the club had ever reached in the competition. Marlin Coast lost the game 3-2 after extra time.

On 27 September 2025, Marlin Coast Rangers again created history by becoming the first ever regional team to win the FQPL Champions League with a 3-0 win over FQPL 1 Champions Magic United. After again winning the league and the Crad Evans Shield in 2025, this took O'Hare's tally to 7 trophies in just 2 seasons at the helm following his return to Pennell Field.

== Notable former players ==
- (Australia) Winonah Heatley – MCR Junior

== Current squad ==
As of 28 September 2025

Note: Flags indicate national team as defined under FIFA eligibility rules; some limited exceptions apply. Players may hold more than one non-FIFA nationality.

No.	Pos.	Nation	Player
23	GK	AUS	Kev Ward
2	DF	AUS	Kal Kumar
3	DF	IRL	Jordan O'Brien
4	DF	AUS	Charlie Beverley (Captain)
5	DF	AUS	Oliver Berry
7	MF	JPN	Nori Nishida
8	MF	IRL	Ciaran Murray
9	MF	AUS	Josh De Nittis
10	FW	AUS	Crios O'Hare
11	MF	AUS	Josh Taylor
12	DF	WAL	James Corrigan

No.	Pos.	Nation	Player
14	DF	RSA	Jordan Boshoff
15	MF	CIV	Fabrice Kouby
17	FW	AUS	Josh Pin
18	FW	AUS	Cooper Kennedy
20	MF	AUS	Brent Powell
21	MF	AUS	Jake Broomhead
22	DF	ENG	Calum Smith
25	DF	AUS	Sam Humphries
26	FW	AUS	Henri Mackenzie
27	MF	AUS	Jimmy Breeze
33	MF	AUS	Campbell Pike

== Honours ==
=== Football Queensland ===
- FQPL Far North & Gulf
  - League Champions
    - Winners (8): 1952, 1954, 2007, 2009, 2010, 2012, 2013, 2024, 2025
  - Grand Final
    - Winners (6): 2007, 2008, 2009, 2010, 2013, 2024
  - League Cup
    - Winners (2): 1954, 2022
- Crad Evans Shield
    - Winners (5): 2007, 2010, 2013, 2024, 2025
- FQPL Mitre Champions League
    - Winners (1): 2025
    - Regional Winners (1): 2025

== See also ==
- List of soccer clubs in Australia
