= The Parks Football Centre =

Football stadium in Angle Park, South Australia

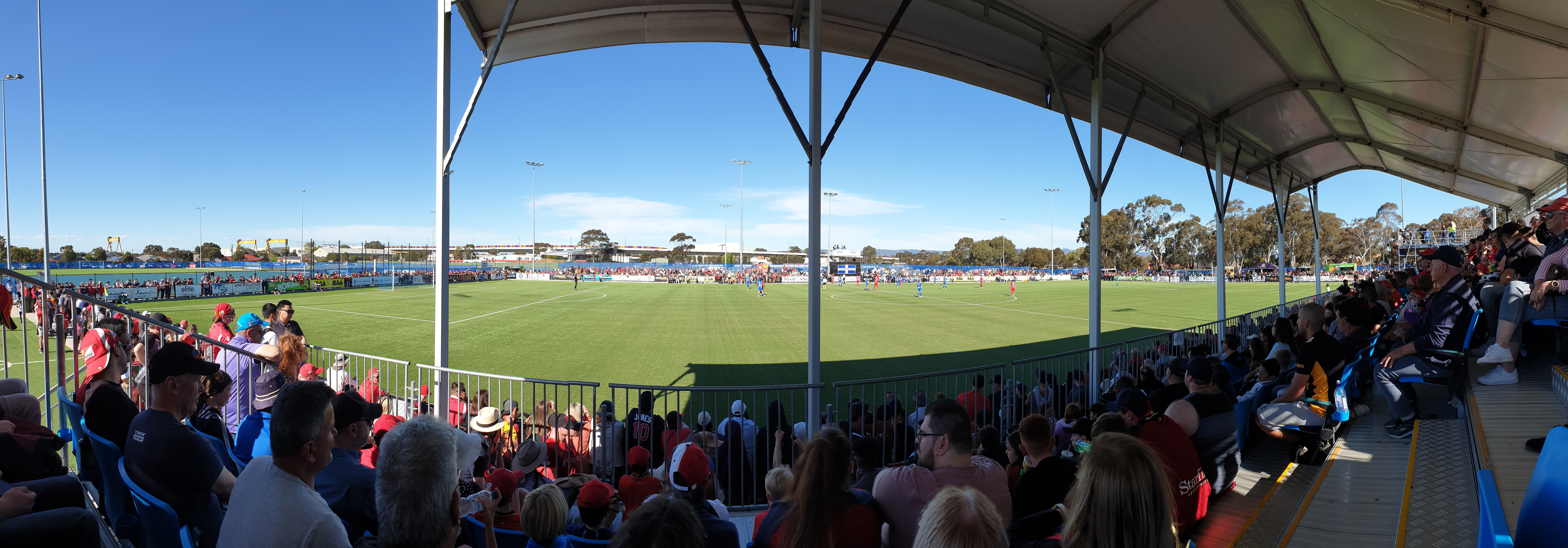
- Interactive map of The Parks Football Centre
- Location: Angle Park, South Australia
- Coordinates: 34.86°S 138.56°E
- Owner: Football South Australia
- Capacity: 2,750 (200 seated)
- Surface: Artificial
- Record attendance: 2,637 (Adelaide Olympic vs Adelaide United, 17 October 2021)

Construction
- Opened: 2014

Tenants
- Adelaide Olympic (NPLSA) (2015–); Vipers FC (SL1SA) (2022–)

The Parks Football Centre (known as the L3 Football Stadium for sponsorship reasons) is a football stadium in Angle Park, South Australia. The venue was built as only the second full size synthetic pitch in South Australia.
