= 2022 in Queensland soccer =

Football Queensland Season
- Season: 2022

The 2022 Football Queensland season was the tenth season since NPL Queensland commenced as the highest-ranking level of Queensland men’s football. The 2022 season was also the fifth season of the Football Queensland Premier League and the second season of the Football Queensland Premier League 2, representing the second and third tiers of Queensland men's football respectively. It was also the inaugural season of the FQPL Champions League for the Northern Conference.

Below NPL Queensland and the FQPL is a regional structure of nine zones with their own leagues.

== Men's League Tables ==
=== 2022 National Premier Leagues Queensland ===
NPL Queensland
- Season: 2022

The 2022 National Premier Leagues Queensland season was the 10th season of first division football in Queensland under the National Premier Leagues banner. The season ran from 19 March to 27 August, as a double round-robin over 22 rounds, followed by a finals series.

Pos	Team	Pld	W	D	L	GF	GA	GD	Pts	Qualification or relegation
1	Lions FC	22	16	3	3	74	32	+42	51	2022 National Premier Leagues Finals
2	Gold Coast Knights (C)	22	11	6	5	44	27	+17	39	2022 NPL Queensland Finals
3	Peninsula Power	22	12	3	7	50	35	+15	39	2022 NPL Queensland Finals
4	Olympic FC	22	11	5	6	54	37	+17	38	2022 NPL Queensland Finals
5	Brisbane City	22	10	3	9	49	40	+9	33	
6	Gold Coast United	22	9	5	8	37	34	+3	32	
7	Eastern Suburbs	22	9	4	9	41	49	−8	31	
8	Sunshine Coast Wanderers	22	7	9	6	37	38	−1	30	
9	Moreton Bay United	22	8	4	10	49	38	+11	28	
10	Logan Lightning (R)	22	7	5	10	32	52	−20	26	Relegation to the 2023 FQPL 1
11	Brisbane Roar Youth	22	4	4	14	29	58	−29	16	
12	Capalaba (R)	22	0	5	17	24	80	−56	5	Relegation to the 2023 FQPL 1

Source: mygameday
Rules for classification: 1) points; 2) goal difference; 3) number of goals scored.
(C) Champions; (R) Relegated

==== Finals ====
Semi-finals
1	Lions FC	2
4	Olympic FC	3
2	Gold Coast Knights	3
3	Peninsula Power	2

Grand final
4	Olympic FC	0
2	Gold Coast Knights	2

=== 2022 Football Queensland Premier League 1 ===
Football Queensland Premier League 1
- Season: 2022

Pos	Team	Pld	W	D	L	GF	GA	GD	Pts	Qualification or relegation
1	Redlands United	20	15	2	3	56	20	+36	47	Promotion to the 2023 NPL Queensland. Qualification for Finals
2	Rochedale Rovers	20	14	3	3	53	32	+21	45	Promotion to the 2023 NPL Queensland. Qualification for Finals
3	Brisbane Strikers	20	10	3	7	44	39	+5	33	Qualification for Finals
4	SWQ Thunder	20	10	2	8	40	38	+2	32	Qualification for Finals
5	Magpies Crusaders United	20	10	1	9	52	53	−1	31	Withdrew
6	Western Pride	20	9	1	10	39	38	+1	28	
7	Southside Eagles	20	8	4	8	32	32	0	28	
8	Sunshine Coast	20	7	2	11	26	38	−12	23	
9	Caboolture Sports	20	6	3	11	38	58	−20	21	
10	Mitchelton	20	6	1	13	36	37	−1	19	
11	Ipswich Knights	20	3	2	15	31	62	−31	11	Relegation to 2023 FQPL 2

Source: mygameday
Rules for classification: 1) points; 2) goal difference; 3) number of goals scored.

==== Finals ====
Semi-finals
1	Redlands United	3
4	SWQ Thunder	1
2	Rochedale Rovers	4
3	Brisbane Strikers	1

Grand final
1	Redlands United	3
2	Rochedale Rovers	2

=== 2022 Football Queensland Premier League 2 ===
Football Queensland Premier League 2
- Season: 2022

Pos	Team	Pld	W	D	L	GF	GA	GD	Pts	Qualification or relegation
1	Surfers Paradise Apollo	22	17	4	1	85	33	+52	55	Promotion to 2023 FQPL 1. Qualification for Finals
2	Albany Creek Excelsior	22	12	7	3	59	31	+28	43	Promotion to 2023 FQPL 1. Qualification for Finals
3	Wynnum Wolves	22	13	3	6	55	36	+19	42	Promotion to 2023 FQPL 1. Qualification for Finals
4	Samford Rangers	22	11	4	7	57	53	+4	37	Qualification for Finals
5	Holland Park Hawks	22	9	4	9	51	44	+7	31	
6	Souths United	22	9	3	10	44	52	−8	30	
7	Grange Thistle	22	8	3	11	37	41	−4	27	
8	North Star	22	8	3	11	33	47	−14	27	
9	Taringa Rovers	22	7	5	10	41	51	−10	26	
10	Magic United	22	6	6	10	37	43	−6	24	
11	Coomera Colts	22	4	5	13	47	80	−33	17	Relegation to 2023 FQPL 3
12	Virginia United	22	3	3	16	32	67	−35	12	Relegation to 2023 FQPL 3

Source: mygameday
Rules for classification: 1) points; 2) goal difference; 3) number of goals scored.

==== Finals ====
Semi-finals
1	Surfers Paradise Apollo	2
4	Samford Rangers	0
2	Albany Creek Excelsior	0
3	Wynnum Wolves	4

Grand final
1	Surfers Paradise Apollo	3
3	Wynnum Wolves	1

=== 2022 Football Queensland Premier League 3 − Metro ===
Football Queensland Premier League 3 − Metro
- Season: 2022
- Champions: St George Willawong
- Premiers: The Lakes
- Promoted: The Lakes, St George Willawong
- Matches: 132
- Goals: 560 (4.24 per match)

Pos	Team	Pld	W	D	L	GF	GA	GD	Pts	Qualification or relegation
1	The Lakes	22	17	2	3	69	32	+37	53	Promotion to 2023 FQPL 2. Qualification for Finals
2	St George Willawong	22	17	1	4	59	28	+31	52	Promotion to 2023 FQPL 2. Qualification for Finals
3	Newmarket	22	14	4	4	71	44	+27	46	Qualification for Finals
4	Bayside United	22	14	3	5	55	36	+19	45	Qualification for Finals
5	Pine Hills	22	11	2	9	55	33	+22	35	
6	Acacia Ridge	22	10	4	8	43	40	+3	34	
7	Toowong	22	7	5	10	35	43	−8	26	Withdrew
8	Western Spirit	22	6	2	14	44	68	−24	20	
9	University of Queensland	22	6	1	15	33	53	−20	19	
10	Centenary Stormers	22	5	3	14	36	57	−21	18	
11	Mt Gravatt Hawks	22	4	5	13	26	55	−29	17	
12	The Gap	22	4	2	16	34	71	−37	14	Relegation to 2023 FQPL 4

Source: mygameday
Rules for classification: 1) points; 2) goal difference; 3) number of goals scored.

==== Finals ====
Semi-finals
1	The Lakes	0
4	Bayside United	1
2	St George Willawong	4
3	Wynnum Wolves	3

Grand final
4	Bayside United	2
2	St George Willawong	3

=== 2022 Football Queensland Premier League 3 − South Coast ===
FQPL3 South Coast was expanded to 12 teams in 2023, so there was no relegation to FQPL4 this season.

Football Queensland Premier League 3 − South Coast
- Season: 2022
- Champions: Broadbeach United

Pos	Team	Pld	W	D	L	GF	GA	GD	Pts	Qualification or relegation
1	Broadbeach United	18	16	0	2	79	16	+63	48	Promotion to FQPL 2. Qualification for Finals
2	Robina City	18	14	3	1	63	14	+49	45	Qualification for Finals
3	Palm Beach Sharks	18	14	0	4	73	23	+50	42	Qualification for Finals
4	Southport	18	9	3	6	35	23	+12	30	Qualification for Finals
5	Kingscliff Wolves	18	9	2	7	65	38	+27	29	
6	Burleigh Heads	18	6	4	8	35	34	+1	22	
7	Musgrave Mustangs	18	6	2	10	47	63	−16	20	
8	Runaway Bay	18	5	2	11	41	40	+1	17	
9	Tallebudgera Valley	18	2	0	16	23	108	−85	6	
10	Nerang Eagles	18	1	0	17	8	110	−102	3	

Source: mygameday
Rules for classification: 1) points; 2) goal difference; 3) number of goals scored.

==== Finals ====
Semi-finals
1	Broadbeach United	1
4	Southport Warriors	0
2	Robina City	0p
3	Palm Beach	0

Grand final
1	Broadbeach United	3
2	Robina City	2

=== 2022 Football Queensland Premier League 3 − Sunshine Coast ===
Football Queensland Premier League 3 − Sunshine Coast
- Season: 2022
- Champions: Maroochydore FC

Pos	Team	Pld	W	D	L	GF	GA	GD	Pts	Qualification or relegation
1	Maroochydore FC	16	14	2	0	50	12	+38	44	Qualification for Finals & FQPL 2 play-off
2	Kawana FC	16	11	1	4	43	21	+22	34	Qualification for Finals
3	Woombye Snakes	16	9	1	6	33	33	0	28	Qualification for Finals
4	Noosa Lions	16	8	3	5	38	21	+17	27	Qualification for Finals
5	Gympie United	16	8	1	7	31	30	+1	25	
6	Caloundra FC	16	7	1	8	25	32	−7	22	
7	Nambour Yandina United	16	5	2	9	22	27	−5	17	
8	Coolum FC	16	2	2	12	19	39	−20	8	
9	Beerwah Glasshouse United	16	0	3	13	14	60	−46	3	

Source: mygameday
Rules for classification: 1) points; 2) goal difference; 3) number of goals scored.

==== Finals ====
Semi-finals
1	Maroochydore FC	1
2	Kawana FC	2
3	Woombye Snakes	1
4	Noosa Lions	2

Preliminary Final
1	Maroochydore FC	4
4	Noosa Lions	2

Grand Final
2	Kawana FC	1
1	Maroochydore FC	2

=== 2022 Football Queensland Premier League 3 − Darling Downs ===
Football Queensland Premier League 3 − Darling Downs
- Season: 2022
- Champions: Willowburn
- Premiers: Willowburn

Pos	Team	Pld	W	D	L	GF	GA	GD	Pts	Qualification or relegation
1	Willowburn FC	20	14	6	0	61	23	+38	48	Qualification for Finals & FQPL 2 play-off
2	West Wanderers	20	9	5	6	48	31	+17	32	Qualification for Finals
3	St Albans	20	10	1	9	47	48	−1	31	Qualification for Finals
4	Gatton Redbacks	20	8	2	10	39	46	−7	26	Qualification for Finals
5	Rockville Rovers	20	6	5	9	36	45	−9	23	
6	Highfields FC	20	2	3	15	23	61	−38	9	

Source: mygameday
Rules for classification: 1) points; 2) goal difference; 3) number of goals scored.

==== Finals ====
Semi-finals
1	Willowburn FC	1 3
4	Gatton Redbacks	1 2
2	West Wanderers	3 4
3	St Albans	3 3

Grand final
1	Willowburn FC	3
2	West Wanderers	2

=== FQPL 2 promotion play-off ===
Final
FQPL 3 SC (1st)	Maroochydore FC	8
FQPL 3 DD (1st)	Willowburn FC	1
