= Murray Goodwin (athlete) =

Australian athlete (born 1987)

Personal information
- Nationality: Australian
- Born: 16 January 1987 (age 39) Tweed Heads, New South Wales, Australia
- Height: 1.78 m (5 ft 10 in)
- Weight: 70 kg (154 lb)

Sport
- Sport: Track and field
- Event: Sprints
- Club: Pizzey Park
Medal record
Men's athletics
Representing Australia
Event	1st	2nd	3rd
Total	0	0	0

Murray Goodwin (born 16 January 1987) is an Australian athlete.

== Personal life ==
Goodwin was born on the Gold Coast in Queensland. His father was a national level 800m runner. Goodwin completed a teaching degree at university and became a physical education teacher at Varsity College.

== Soccer career ==
Goodwin began playing soccer at the local level for Burleigh Heads in 2005 and regularly switched clubs, including stints with Merrimac, Mudgeeraba and Surfers Paradise. At his highest level, Goodwin played semi-professional soccer in 2010 for the Gold Coast Stars in the Queensland State League, one step below the professional A-League. In 2012 he was a part of the undefeated Merrimac team that won the Gold Coast Premier League.

== Athletics career ==
Goodwin grew up competing in athletics events on the Gold Coast and set several city records in the process. He quit athletics in 2005 to focus on his university studies and began playing soccer. In 2014, at 27 years of age, Goodwin returned to athletics to have one last shot at a career in the sport. He began training with Currumbin Vikings beach sprint coach Brett Robinson who led fellow Gold Coaster Mitchell Williams to a 2011 Stawell Gift victory. In April 2015 Goodwin won the Stawell Gift, Australia's most prestigious foot race. His preferred event is the 400m sprint.
