= Gold Coast Knights F.C. =

Gold Coast Knights
- Full name: Gold Coast Knights Football Club
- Nickname: Knights
- Founded: 1979; 47 years ago (as St. Anthony's Soccer Club)
- Ground: Croatian Sports Centre
- Capacity: 1,000
- Chairman: Elvis Rajic
- Manager: Alex Morrison
- League: NPL Queensland
- 2025: 5th of 12
- Website: gcknightsfc.com.au

Gold Coast Knights Football Club is a semi-professional soccer club based in Carrara, Queensland, Australia. The Croatian Australian backed club play in the National Premier Leagues Queensland, the top level of the Football Queensland and the second level of the Australian soccer league system. The club has won three NPL Queensland championship, one premiership, one state cup and a variety of regional honours.

Gold Coast Knights was established in 1979, with the first senior team fielded within the Gold Coast's second division in 1979. The club originally played at Musgrave Hill until 1982, when it moved to the Croatian Sports Centre in Carrara. The club won its first major honour in 1981, where the club won the Gold Coast top division President's Cup under the former name, St. Anthony's Soccer Club. The club has been one of the most successful soccer clubs based on the Gold Coast.

Gold Coast Knights soccer club has hosted the Australian-Croatian Soccer Tournament in 1995, 2012, 2018 and 2025.

== History ==
=== 1978−1999: Formation and name changes ===
Gold Coast Knights Soccer Club was formed by a group of Croatian migrants in the Gold Coast region in 1978, under the name St. Anthony's Soccer Club. The club has just one side, an U-14 side, which was coached by Mladen Marinac. The side trained at Aquinas College and played its home games at Musgrave Hill. In 1979, a senior team was formed and entered the local Men's 2nd Division competition. The growth of the Croatian migrant population in Gold Coast coincided with the growth of the club. In 1981, under the leadership of Željko Bambić, a Men's 1st Division side was entered. In 1982, the club bought land in Carrara, Queensland, where two fields were put down and a small clubhouse built. The first game was played at Carrara in 1984, a year in which, under the leadership of coach Charlie Runje, the club won the Premiership and the Presidents Cup. In the late 80s, St. Anthony's became Gold Coast Croatia Soccer Club. In 1991, the club decided to redevelop the clubrooms to cater for the expanding needs of the club. In the 90s, the football federation requested "Croatia" to be removed from the club's name and so, after spending a year as Gold Coast C.S.C., the club settled on the name Carrara Cro's Soccer Club in 1993. They kept this name until 1999, when the club became known as Gold Coast Knights Soccer Club. The name change followed a meeting with National Soccer League side Melbourne Knights FC, with whom a sister-club relationship was formed.

=== 1999−2019: Gold Coast leagues ===
The 2003 Gold Coast Premier League season saw the Gold Coast Knights win both the President's Cup and the premiership. The club wouldn't crown another premiership for another 5 years, where they earned the 2008 trophy. In 2014, Gold Coast Knights experienced the first relegation in the club's history, falling from the Gold Coast Premier League to Division 1. In 2015, the Knights just avoided successive relegations, finishing just two points above the relegated Nerang Eagles, collecting only 15 points in 21 games that season.

At the club's Annual General Meeting in 2015, businessman Adrian Puljich became the new chairman. Knights immediately underwent a rebrand, which saw a new logo introduced. Work commenced on new change room facilities and tower lights for the pitches at the Croatian Sports Centre were installed. The 2016 season started well, as the Knights took out the BLK Pre-Season Cup. Success continued and the Knights earned the right of promotion back to the Premier League for the 2017 season after winning the Division 1 title. Having only lost one game all season, the Knights continued their form into the finals series and took out the double by winning the championship.

The 2017 season saw further success for Gold Coast Knights, winning the Premier League title for the first time in nine years in the first season back in the top flight of Gold Coast football. In the finals series, Knights lost to Broadbeach United on penalties in the preliminary final, but beat the Burleigh Heads Bulldogs to qualify for the grand final. There, Knights lost again to Broadbeach, this time 2–1.

Knights qualified for the 2018 FFA Cup Round of 32 when it defeated Sunshine Coast, scoring two late goals to take the game out 3–2 after extra-time. It was the third straight NPL Queensland side that Knights had defeated on their way to the Round of 32. In the Round of 32, Knights drew A-League side Newcastle Jets, going down 1–0 at Robina Stadium in front of 2,220 people. The club won the Gold Coast Premier League premiership with two rounds to spare, following a 2–0 win over Palm Beach Sharks, with a record of 14 wins, 2 draws and 0 losses. In the finals series, Knights lost 2–1 to Broadbeach United in the qualifying final, its first loss all season, before beating Surfers Paradise Apollo 5–4 in the elimination final and then Broadbeach 5–1 in the grand final, handing the club its first ever Gold Coast Premier League championship.

=== Since 2019: National Premier Leagues Queensland ===
In November 2017, it was announced that Knights would join the National Premier Leagues Queensland from 2019, becoming part of the top-flight of football in the state. Knights took the place of Gold Coast City FC, who dissolved and hence gave up their place in the competition.

In March 2019, Gold Coast signed Mitch Nichols in one of the highest profile coups in the club's history. Later that season, the club also signed Matt Smith, a former Socceroo and Brisbane Roar championship-winning captain. In its first season in the NPL Queensland, the Knights finished in 2nd position, 4 points off premiers Queensland Lions, with a 22–4–2 record. In the finals series, the Knights beat Peninsula Power 2–1 at home, setting up a Grand Final against Olympic FC who had defeated the premiers Lions FC. A 10-man Knights held out to defeat Olympic 2–1 and claim its first NPL Queensland championship.

After a 4–1 loss to bottom side Sunshine Coast Wanderers on Sunday 30 August 2020, Knights parted ways with head coach Grae Piddick. Before their loss to the Wanderers, the Knights had not dropped a game since July 2019.

Knights named Scott McDonald as its new senior head coach on 26 August 2021 for the upcoming 2022 season. McDonald was capped 26 times for the Australia men's national soccer team during his playing career.

Gold Coast Knights finished in 2nd in the regular season of 2022. In the finals series, Knights defeated Peninsula Power 3–1 in the semi-final and Olympic 2–0 in the grand final to achieve its second ever NPL Queensland championship.

== Managers ==
Name	Nationality	From	To
Mladen Marinac		1978	1980
Željko Bambić		1981	1983
Charlie Runje		1984	unk
Paul Osborne	England	1 November 2014	30 October 2015
Oscar Langone	Argentina	1 November 2015	1 April 2016
Alex Morrison	Australia	1 April 2016	2 October 2017
Grae Piddick	Australia	1 November 2017	30 August 2020
Adem Poric	Australia	31 August 2020	17 July 2021
Max Wragg	(England) Australia	17 July 2021	24 October 2021
Scott McDonald	Australia	25 October 2021	11 July 2025
David Abela	Australia	11 July 2025	30 September 2025
Alex Morrison	Australia	1 October 2025	present

== Facilities ==
Gold Coast Knights are based at the Croatian Sports Centre, located on 181 Nerang Broadbeach Rd, Carrara QLD 4211. The site is the central hub of the Croatian community in the Gold Coast region. The centre was established in 1983 on approximately six acres of land and features a modern-club house and two full size soccer fields.

In 2012, the club started a project to increase the amount of change rooms from two to six. Over the summer of 2015–16, Knights added four new light posts, increasing the lighting on the pitches to 220 lux.

== Current squad ==
As of 25 March 2026

Note: Flags indicate national team as defined under FIFA eligibility rules; some limited exceptions apply. Players may hold more than one non-FIFA nationality.

No.	Pos.	Nation	Player
1	GK	AUS	Sebastian Arranz
2	DF	AUS	Ethan Jones
3	DF	JPN	Ko Ikeda
4	MF	AUS	Tyson Martin
6	DF	ENG	Luke Croll
7	MF	AUS	David Russell
8	FW	JPN	Yuto Morita
9	FW	AUS	Joel Russell
10	FW	AUS	Brad Inman
11	MF	AUS	Cody Nancarrow
12	DF	AUS	Shelford Dais

No.	Pos.	Nation	Player
13	GK	AUS	Harry Groves
14	MF	AUS	Hibiki Tomioka
15	DF	AUS	Ryan Harraway
17	DF	AUS	Lennard Atterwell
18	MF	AUS	Daniel Dias
19	FW	AUS	Tanaj Kunst
20	DF	AUS	Ollie Reid
21	MF	AUS	Alfie Kemble
22	MF	AUS	Max King

== Honours ==
=== Football Queensland ===
- National Premier Leagues Queensland (first tier)
  - Premiership
    - Winners (2): 2023, 2024
  - Championship
    - Winners (3): 2019, 2022, 2023
- Kappa Pro Series
    - Winners (1): 2023
- Kappa Queensland Cup
    - Winners (1): 2025
- Croatian-Australian Soccer Tournament
    - Winners (1): 2025

=== Football South Coast ===
- FQPL 3 − South Coast / Gold Coast Premier League (first tier)
  - Premiership
    - Winners (5): 1984, 2003, 2008, 2017, 2018
  - Championship
    - Winners (1): 2018
  - President's Cup
    - Winners (4): 1981, 1984, 1986, 2003
- FQPL 4 − South Coast / Men's Coast League 1 / First Division (second tier)
  - Premiership
    - Winners (1): 2016
  - Championship
    - Winners (1): 2016
  - Pre-Season Cup
    - Winners (1): 2016

== See also ==
- List of Croatian football clubs in Australia
- Australian-Croatian Soccer Tournament
