= Lyndon Dykes =

Scotland international footballer (born 1995)

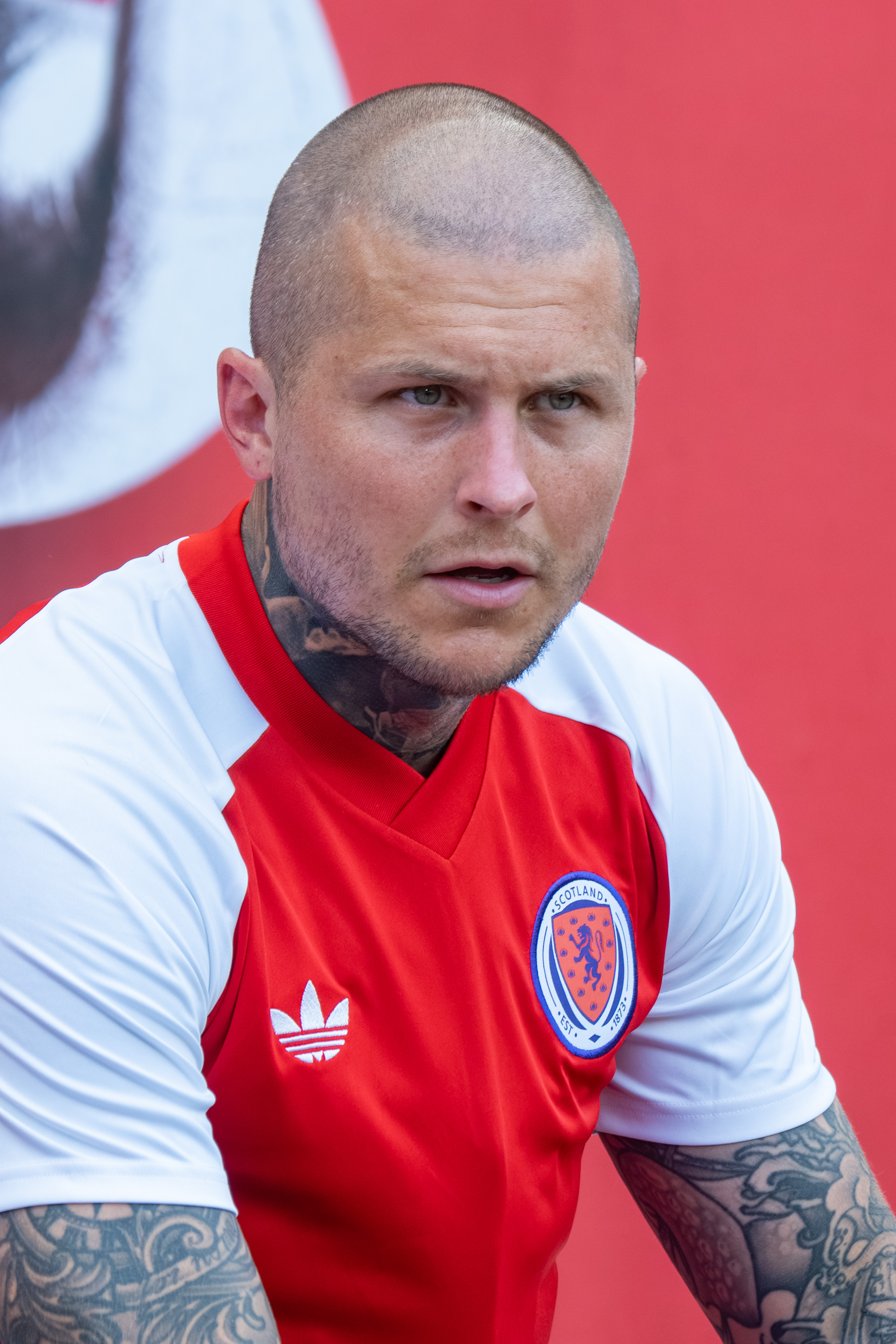
- Dykes with Scotland in 2026

Personal information
- Full name: Lyndon John Dykes
- Date of birth: 7 October 1995 (age 31)
- Place of birth: Gold Coast, Queensland, Australia
- Height: 6 ft 2 in (1.88 m)
- Position: Striker

Team information
- Current team: Millwall
- Number: 13

Youth career
- Mudgeeraba

Senior career*
Years	Team	Apps	(Gls)
2013	Mudgeeraba	5	(0)
2014	Merrimac	16	(10)
2014–2015	Queen of the South	0	(0)
2015	Redlands United	15	(7)
2015	Gold Coast City	1	(0)
2016	Surfers Paradise Apollo	5	(3)
2016–2019	Queen of the South	100	(11)
2019–2020	Livingston	28	(11)
2020–2024	Queens Park Rangers	156	(35)
2024–2026	Birmingham City	46	(3)
2026	Charlton Athletic	20	(3)
2026–	Millwall	15	(4)

International career^{‡}
2020–	Scotland	53	(10)
- * Club domestic league appearances and goals as of 17:10, 15 November 2026 (UTC) ‡ National team caps and goals as of 01:10, 20 June 2026 (UTC)

Lyndon John Dykes (born 7 October 1995) is a professional footballer who plays as a striker for EFL Championship club Millwall. Born and raised in Australia to Scottish parents, he plays for the Scotland national team.

Dykes previously played for Mudgeeraba, Merrimac, Redlands United, Gold Coast City and Surfers Paradise Apollo in Australia, for Queen of the South and Livingston in Scotland, and spent four years with English club Queens Park Rangers before spells at Birmingham City and Charlton Athletic.

== Personal life ==
Dykes was born on the Gold Coast in Queensland, Australia. He moved to Canberra, Australian Capital Territory, playing rugby league as a youth. As a child, Dykes had a season pass to the Canberra Raiders and idolised captain Ruben Wiki at the time. In his youth, Dykes also played basketball, rugby union and Aussie Rules football. After returning to Australia from a stint with Queen of the South Under-20s team, Dykes worked in a factory for sports company BLK.

Dykes said of his background, "My parents are Scottish. They are from Dumfries. My dad is from just outside Dumfries, a small town called Moniaive." His elder sister Hollie was a gold medal-winning gymnast for Australia at the 2006 Commonwealth Games. Dykes' son was born in Scotland.

== Club career ==
=== Early career ===
Dykes spent part of his younger years living and playing rugby league in Canberra where his family settled. Dykes attracted the interest of the Canberra Raiders after helping Gungahlin Bulls to a cup final win. The move never came about as Dykes suffered an injury and his family moved back to the Gold Coast.

Dykes played youth football for Mudgeeraba before joining Merrimac. He then played in the 2015 National Premier Leagues Queensland with Redlands United and joined Gold Coast City FC the year after but soon departed to play that season for Surfers Paradise Apollo SC for one month. Dykes was rejected by A-League sides such as Brisbane Roar when playing football in Australia.

=== Queen of the South ===
Dykes toured England with the Australian schoolboys, after which he visited relatives in Dumfries, the home town of his parents. He then returned to Dumfries to play for the Queen of the South Under-20s team. He scored 22 goals in 14 competitive matches at this level before returning to Australia in January 2015.

On 7 June 2016, Dykes returned to Scotland and signed for Queen of the South, who had Gavin Skelton as their manager at that time. Dykes' senior competitive debut was representing Queen's when aged 20 in a 2–0 Scottish League Cup win versus Queen's Park at the Excelsior Stadium on 16 July. His first senior goal was an 86th-minute strike on 9 August in the Queen's 3–1 League Cup win over Hibernian.

On 7 December 2017, Dykes signed an extension to his contract that kept him at the club until 31 May 2019. In three years in Dumfries, he played in 86 league matches, scoring 10 league goals and in 31 cup matches scoring nine cup goals for the Doonhamers. His best position for the club was as a foil for Queens main striker Stephen Dobbie, especially when Dobbie scored 43 goals in the 2018–19 season, although he was also played on the wings.

=== Livingston ===
On 30 January 2019, Dykes secured a two-year contract to join Livingston, but the Doonhamers reached an agreement with the West Lothian club for him to stay at Palmerston Park until the end of the 2018–19 season. Dykes was utilised as a central striker at the Lions. He scored on his senior competitive debut for the Lions in a 1–1 League Cup draw at Falkirk on 13 July. On 12 September, he extended his contract with the Lions for an additional season until May 2022. On 6 October, he scored the second goal in the 2–0 home league win versus Celtic. On 21 December, he scored a hat-trick in a 4–0 win versus Ross County, the first time a Livingston player had done so in the top flight.

On 16 August 2020, Livingston announced that a bid has been accepted from a Championship club for Dykes. Three days later, it was announced that he joined Queens Park Rangers. Dykes' transfer fee broke Livingston's club record previously held by the sale of David Fernandez to Celtic in 2002. Queen of the South are due a six-figure fee as part of the deal, as a sell-on clause was included when Dykes was sold to Livingston, with the figure likely to surpass the club's £250,000 record fee received when Andy Thomson moved to Southend United in 1994.

=== Queens Park Rangers ===
On 19 August 2020, Dykes signed a four-year deal for English club Queens Park Rangers for a reported fee of £2m. On 12 September, Dykes scored on his competitive debut for the club, scoring a penalty in the 54th minute, in a 2–0 win versus Nottingham Forest.

In April 2021, Dykes was named the club's Player of the Month after scoring six goals in six games most notably scoring a brace in a 4–1 win over Sheffield Wednesday on 10 April. Dykes had finished the season as QPR's top scorer with 12 goals and five assists. On 16 October 2021, Dykes scored in the West London derby in Queens Park Rangers' 4–1 loss against Fulham in the Championship. In January 2023, Dykes was admitted to hospital with the club said to be "closely monitoring" the striker. He spent eight days in hospital having been diagnosed with pneumonia following a CT scan on his lungs. On 26 June 2023, Dykes signed a new three-year contract with the club.

=== Birmingham City ===
Dykes signed for League One club Birmingham City on a three-year contract on 28 August 2024; the fee was undisclosed.

=== Charlton Athletic ===
On 15 January 2026, Dykes joined Championship club Charlton Athletic on a deal for the remainder of the 2025–26 season. On 8 May 2026, the club said it was in talks with player about extending his contract.

=== Millwall ===
On 6 August 2026, Dykes joined Millwall on a one-year contract.

== International career ==
Dykes played for Australia schoolboys prior to joining Queen of the South. He was eligible to represent either Australia (where he was born) or Scotland.

When playing with Livingston, Australia's assistant manager Rene Meulensteen came to watch Dykes play against Celtic in October 2019. The same week, Scotland manager Steve Clarke also contacted Dykes, who "went with my heart and my gut" and chose Scotland. On 25 August 2020, Dykes was named in the Scotland squad for the first time for UEFA Nations League matches versus Israel and the Czech Republic. He made his international debut in a 1–1 draw with Israel on 4 September and then scored his first goal for Scotland a few days later in a 2–1 victory over the Czech Republic. On 11 October, Dykes scored the winner in a Nations League match against Slovakia which ended 1–0 after steering home Stephen O'Donnell's low cross.

On 19 May 2021, Dykes was named in Scotland's UEFA Euro 2020 squad after becoming the nation's first choice striker alongside Che Adams. On 14 June, he played 79 minutes of Scotland's opening game which resulted in a 2–0 defeat to the Czech Republic. On 18 June, he played the full 90 minutes in the fixture against England at Wembley Stadium which ended in a 0–0 draw. On 22 June, he started in a 3–1 defeat to Croatia which ended Scotland's Euros campaign.

On 4 September 2021, Dykes scored in the only goal against Moldova in a 2022 World Cup qualifier. Three days later he scored a 30th-minute penalty in another 1–0 win for Scotland, this time away to Austria in the same competition. The following month, Dykes scored in narrow wins over Israel and the Faroe Islands, becoming the first Scotland player to score in four consecutive matches since Colin Stein in 1969.

In a UEFA Nations League match against Ukraine on 21 September 2022, Dykes came off the bench in the 77th minute to score a brace, in the 80th and 87th minutes respectively, to secure a 3–0 win for Scotland.

Dykes helped Scotland qualify for UEFA Euro 2024, scoring the equaliser and providing the assist for the winning goal in a 2–1 away win against Norway in June 2023. He was selected in a 28-man provisional squad for the Euro 2024 finals, but he had to withdraw prior to the tournament after suffering an ankle injury in training.

On 19 May 2026, Dykes was selected in the 26-man squad for the 2026 FIFA World Cup, going on to make appearances at Boston Stadium in Scotland's win over Haiti and loss to Morocco on 14 and 19 June, respectively.

== Career statistics ==
=== Club ===
As of match played 7 November 2026

Appearances and goals by club, season and competition
Club	Season	League			National cup (Note: Includes Scottish Cup, FA Cup)		League cup (Note: Includes Scottish League Cup, EFL Cup)		Other		Total	
Club	Season	Division	Apps	Goals	Apps	Goals	Apps	Goals	Apps	Goals	Apps	Goals
Queen of the South	2016–17	Scottish Championship	30	2	1	0	6	1	3 (Note: Appearances in Scottish Challenge Cup)	1	40	4
Queen of the South	2017–18	Scottish Championship	34	7	3	0	4	0	3	1	44	8
Queen of the South	2018–19	Scottish Championship	36	2	4	1	5	3	7 (Note: Three appearances and two goals in Scottish Challenge Cup, four appearances and two goals in Scottish Premiership play-offs)	4	52	10
Queen of the South	Total		100	11	8	1	15	4	13	6	136	22
Livingston	2019–20	Scottish Premiership	25	9	2	1	6	2	—		33	12
Livingston	2020–21	Scottish Premiership	3	2	—		—		—		3	2
Livingston	Total		28	11	2	1	6	2	—		36	14
Queens Park Rangers	2020–21	Championship	42	12	1	0	0	0	—		43	12
Queens Park Rangers	2021–22	Championship	33	8	2	1	2	0	—		37	9
Queens Park Rangers	2022–23	Championship	39	8	1	0	0	0	—		40	8
Queens Park Rangers	2023–24	Championship	41	6	1	1	1	0	—		43	7
Queens Park Rangers	2024–25	Championship	1	1	—		1	0	—		2	1
Queens Park Rangers	Total		156	35	5	2	4	0	—		165	37
Birmingham City	2024–25	League One	25	1	3	2	—		4 (Note: Appearances in EFL Trophy)	2	32	5
Birmingham City	2025–26	Championship	21	2	0	0	2	0	—		23	2
Birmingham City	Total		46	3	3	2	2	0	4	2	55	7
Charlton Athletic	2025–26	Championship	20	3	—		—		—		20	3
Millwall	2026–27	Championship	15	4	0	0	2	0	—		17	4
Career total			365	67	18	6	29	6	17	8	429	87

=== International ===
As of match played 19 June 2026

Appearances and goals by national team and year
National team	Year	Apps	Goals
Scotland	2020	7	2
Scotland	2021	13	4
Scotland	2022	6	2
Scotland	2023	9	1
Scotland	2024	7	0
Scotland	2025	6	1
Scotland	2026	5	0
Total		53	10

Scores and results list Scotland's goal tally first, score column indicates score after each Dykes goal.

List of international goals scored by Lyndon Dykes
No.	Date	Venue	Opponent	Score	Result	Competition
1	7 September 2020	Andrův stadion, Olomouc, Czech Republic	Czech Republic	1–1	2–1	2020–21 UEFA Nations League B
2	11 October 2020	Hampden Park, Glasgow, Scotland	Slovakia	1–0	1–0	2020–21 UEFA Nations League B
3	4 September 2021	Hampden Park, Glasgow, Scotland	Moldova	1–0	1–0	2022 FIFA World Cup qualification
4	7 September 2021	Ernst Happel Stadium, Vienna, Austria	Austria	1–0	1–0	2022 FIFA World Cup qualification
5	9 October 2021	Hampden Park, Glasgow, Scotland	Israel	2–2	3–2	2022 FIFA World Cup qualification
6	12 October 2021	Tórsvøllur, Tórshavn, Faroe Islands	Faroe Islands	1–0	1–0	2022 FIFA World Cup qualification
7	21 September 2022	Hampden Park, Glasgow, Scotland	Ukraine	2–0	3–0	2022–23 UEFA Nations League B
8	21 September 2022	Hampden Park, Glasgow, Scotland	Ukraine	3–0	3–0	2022–23 UEFA Nations League B
9	17 June 2023	Ullevaal Stadion, Oslo, Norway	Norway	1–1	2–1	UEFA Euro 2024 qualifying
10	9 October 2025	Hampden Park, Glasgow, Scotland	Greece	3–1	3–1	2026 FIFA World Cup qualification

== Honours ==
Birmingham City

- EFL League One: 2024–25

== See also ==
- List of Scotland international footballers born outside Scotland
