= Broadbeach United S.C. =

Broadbeach United
- Full name: Broadbeach United Soccer Club
- Nicknames: Broadie, The Dolphins, "The Tank" (ground nickname)
- Founded: 1963; 63 years ago
- Ground: Nikiforides Family Park
- Chairman: Michael Doyle
- Manager: Leighton Speechley-Price
- League: FQPL
- 2026: 2nd of 12
- Website: www.broadbeachunited.com.au

Broadbeach United Soccer Club is a semi-professional soccer club based in Broadbeach, Queensland, Australia. The club currently play in the Football Queensland Premier League after promoted from 2023 Football Queensland Premier League 2 and from 2022 Football Queensland Premier League 3 − South Coast, the top flight of the Football Queensland South Coast administrative division, and the fifth flight of the Australian soccer league system. Broadbeach United have won a record 10 premierships, 13 championships and 9 President's Cups within the division.

Founded in 1963, Broadbeach was an inaugural club to join the then Gold Coast top-flight men's soccer competition in 1975. The club plays its home games at Nikiforides Family Park.

== History ==
The Broadbeach juniors were founded in 1970 with the S.S.B juniors disbanding when John Stainsby left Broadbeach Oval to form the Musgrave Soccer Club at Keith Hunt Park.

Most of the founders of S.S.B stayed on board with the club such as David Erwicker, Billy Massa, John Green, Carlo March Shirley Newman, Anne and Archie Shaw. Some stayed for a year or two, before leaving for other clubs. Rini Hendriks came on board with the juniors when his sons came and played for the Broadbeach juniors in 1971. Rini was also Gold Coast United's Brisbane delegate from 1971–79 and then became a Broadbeach United icon for many years. Rini watches his Dolphins still to this day.

Broadbeach seniors were founded in 1980, the year after Gold Coast United folded. With the formation of a new team called Gold Coast City to play in the Brisbane Premier League, and move away from Broadbeach oval, left the possibility of Broadbeach oval having no senior team. However, it was decided by people such as Dave Blake and Eddie Dwight that Broadbeach enter a team in the Gold Coast First Division.

In its first year, Broadbeach won the treble which included the Presidents Cup, Grand Final, and the Premiership trophy, beginning the year with stability and success. Broadbeach remains the only Gold Coast club not to be relegated. Success has been constant through the years and in 1995, the Broadbeach Dolphins won all 4 trophies on offer in a season, successive club championships in 1995 and 1996 followed.

From 2005 to 2015, Broadbeach has won 6 Premierships, 6 Grand Finals and 3 Club Championships. In 2014, the club's four Senior Teams (Premier Firsts, Premier Reserves, Veto Division 2 and Women's Premier) all did the League and Grand Final double, an achievement not yet completed by any other Gold Coast Club.

In August 2022, the men's first team secured the FQPL3 League title on the final day of the home and away season, while also gaining promotion to FQPL2 for the 2023 season.

Early pioneers of the club such as Dave Blake, Eddie Dwight, Carlo March, Micky Baker, Rini Hendriks, Terry Swift, Steve Bennett, Ronny Bell, Sharon Edwards and many others have started a history that has lasted for many years. In more modern times, the likes of Pat Hedges, Dave Rea, Mick and Steve Doyle, the Vernon family and the Broadfoot family have kept Broadbeach as a front runner in the modern era.

On December 1, 2022, Leighton Speechley-Price was named as new head coach.

== Notable players ==
- (New Zealand) Shane Smeltz, former player, Gold Coast United

== Honours ==
=== Football Queensland ===
- Football Queensland Premier League 2 (third tier)
  - Premiership
    - Winners (1) (record): 2023

=== Football South Coast ===
- FQPL 3 − South Coast / Gold Coast Premier League (fourth tier)
  - Premiership
    - Winners (11) (record): 1976, 1985, 1991, 1995, 1999, 2005, 2009, 2011, 2014, 2016, 2022
  - Championship
    - Winners (14) (record): 1976, 1977, 1980, 1991, 1992, 1995, 2006, 2009, 2010, 2012, 2013, 2014, 2017, 2022
  - President's Cup
    - Winners (9) (record): 1976, 1980, 1990, 1991, 1992, 1995, 1999, 2002, 2005
- BLK Pre-season Cup / F.A. Cup
  - Winners (7) (record): 1988 (Note: The Broadbeach United reserve team won the F.A. Cup, being the first and still the only reserve team to do so.), 1989, 1995, 2000, 2004, 2015, 2016, 2018

The list of honours does not include honours achieved by academy or reserve teams, excluding the F.A. Cup win by the reserve team. Both Broadbeach's Premier Firsts and Premier Reserves hold the record for the highest Grand Final winning score lines. The First Team defeated Mudgeeraba in the 2014 Grand Final 6–0 at home. Ten years earlier (2004), the Premier Reserves team defeated then rivals Burleigh Heads Bulldogs, by the same scoreline at Pizzey Park. The Premier Firsts are also the only team in the history of the league to play in seven consecutive Grand Finals (2009–2015), winning five of them.
