= Chris Broadfoot =

Australian footballer

Personal information
- Full name: Christopher Broadfoot
- Date of birth: 11 April 1981 (age 45)
- Place of birth: Glasgow, Scotland
- Height: 1.88 m (6 ft 2 in)
- Position: Striker

Team information
- Current team: Surfers Paradise Apollo

Youth career
- Broadbeach United

Senior career*
Years	Team	Apps	(Gls)
- Toronto Lynx
- Gold Coast Knights
- Burleigh Heads
- Broadbeach United
2010–2012	Gold Coast United	5	(0)
2013–2014	Mudgeeraba		
2015–2016	Broadbeach United		
2016–2018	Gold Coast Knights		
2019	Surfers Paradise Apollo		
2019–	Broadbeach United		
- * Club domestic league appearances and goals

Chris Broadfoot is an Australian footballer.

== Biography ==
A journeyman striker, he has played for numerous Gold Coast Premier League clubs, with a notable spell with Broadbeach United. He signed for Gold Coast United for the 2010 season.

== Honours ==
=== Broadbeach United ===
- Gold Coast Premier League Premiers: 1999

=== Burleigh Heads Bulldogs ===
- Gold Coast Premier League Champions: 2003

=== Individual ===
- Gold Coast Premier League Golden Boot: 1999, 2003
