= Nerang Eagles S.C. =

Nerang Eagles
- Full name: Nerang Soccer Club
- Nicknames: Eagles, The Eagles, Reds
- Founded: 1972; 54 years ago
- Ground: Glennon Park
- Capacity: 2,000
- Chairman: Frederick Stone
- Head Coach: Mark Boelen
- League: Football Queensland Premier League 4 − South Coast
- 2025: Football Queensland Premier League 4 − South Coast; 3rd of 8
- Website: www.nerangsoccer.com
Home colours	Away colours

Nerang Eagles Soccer Club is a semi-professional soccer club based in Nerang, Queensland, Australia. The club play in the Football Queensland Premier League 4 − South Coast, the fifth flight of men's soccer in Queensland and the sixth flight of Australian soccer. The Eagles won the inaugural Gold Coast top-flight premiership and championship in 1975.

After forming in 1972, the club became one of the founding members of the Gold Coast and District Soccer Association in 1975. Following the club's success in the first season of the Gold Coast senior competition, The Eagles would leave the Association in 1976 to join the lower divisions in Brisbane, only a year after it had been established. The club saw success in Brisbane with various premierships, championships and promotions before rejoining the renamed Gold Coast Premier League in 1997. The club played at the Nerang Velodrome upon establishment until moving to Glennon Park in 1987, where The Eagles currently play.

== History ==
=== 1972−1997: Formation years ===
Nerang Soccer Club was founded in 1972 after a group of players from the Tweed District Soccer Association sought to base their team closer to the Gold Coast and pursue stronger football competition. The original home ground was located at the Nerang Velodrome site in Hope Street, Nerang. Initially the club's senior teams played in emerging Gold Coast competitions before moving into various lower divisions within the Brisbane soccer leagues, considered to be a much stronger level of competition and more established football environment than the Tweed District and newer Gold Coast competition could provide at the time.

From 1976 through to the mid-1980s the club ascended through the Brisbane soccer divisions, winning multiple premierships, grand finals and promotions. After consecutive years of growth and success the club abandoned its shared home ground in 1987 to move to its current location at Glennon Park, in Recreation Drive, Nerang. At the 1990 Brisbane Division Two Grand Final the Nerang senior men's team defeated Brisbane Croatia three goals to one, securing the club's promotion into the Brisbane XXXX League First Division (State League), which was considered to be the second tier of football in Australia at the time. In 1991 the club was relegated back to the second division, returning again at the end of the 1995 season to the XXXX League First Division. In 1974 Nerang Soccer Club fielded its first women's team, beginning a long history of women's football success which produced notable representative players including Matildas player Kerrie Rowe. The Eagles won numerous men's, women's and junior premierships and grand finals during their formation years and featured regularly in Brisbane and Gold Coast newspapers and media.

=== Since 1997: Return to the Gold Coast ===
In 1997 a restructuring of soccer in Queensland resulted in Nerang's senior teams leaving the Brisbane competitions and returning home to enter their home city's leagues for the first time since its formative years. The club remains in the Gold Coast competitions and their men's teams currently compete in the Football Queensland Premier League 3 − South Coast (formerly Football Gold Coast Premier League) after securing promotion in 2017 to return to the top flight of Gold Coast Football. The club's various other men's, women's and junior teams all compete on the Gold Coast. On Sunday 30 May 2021 the Nerang Eagles Premier League men's first grade team won its first major trophy since returning to the Gold Coast in 1997, defeating Surfers Paradise Apollo for the 2021 Football Gold Coast President's Cup which ended a twenty three-year drought for the Eagles with no major titles. The match was played at Lex Bell Oval in Isle of Capri on the Gold Coast, and was declared a draw at the end of regulation time with both teams having scored three goals, before going to a penalty shootout where Nerang won with four goals to Surfers Paradise's one goal.

== Partnerships ==
=== Celtic FC ===
In 2017 during a visit to the United Kingdom, representatives from Nerang Soccer Club and the Academy Of Football Australia sought partnership opportunities with professional football clubs, which resulted in a formal partnership being secured with Celtic F.C. to engage in the Celtic Soccer Academy program and be recognised as a partner club to the Celtic F.C. international collection of partner clubs. Nerang Soccer Club has hosted several official Celtic FC training camps with visiting Celtic Soccer Academy coaches instructing local players from Nerang and surrounding clubs. Impacts stemming from restrictions on international travel due to the global COVID-19 pandemic has seen the partnership with Celtic FC fade, becoming dormant since early 2020.

=== Pan Pacific Masters Games ===
Nerang Soccer Club is the current host club for the football component of the biannual Pan Pacific Masters Games, which is held across the Gold Coast every two years. The event showcases dozens of sports with hundreds of competitors aged over 35 years from across the Pacific Nations coming together to contest various age divisions and disciplines, including soccer.

== Honours ==
=== Football South Coast ===
- FQPL 3 − South Coast / Gold Coast Premier League
  - Premiership
    - Winners (1): 1975
  - Championship
    - Winners (1): 1975
  - President's Cup
    - Winners (1): 2021

=== Football Queensland Metro ===
- FQPL 3 − Metro / Brisbane Premier League
  - Premiership
    - Winners (1): 1986
- FQPL 4 − Metro / Capital League 1
  - Premiership
    - Winners (4): 1983, 1990, 1994, 1995
