= Nikiforides Family Park =

Soccer venue in Broadbeach, Queensland

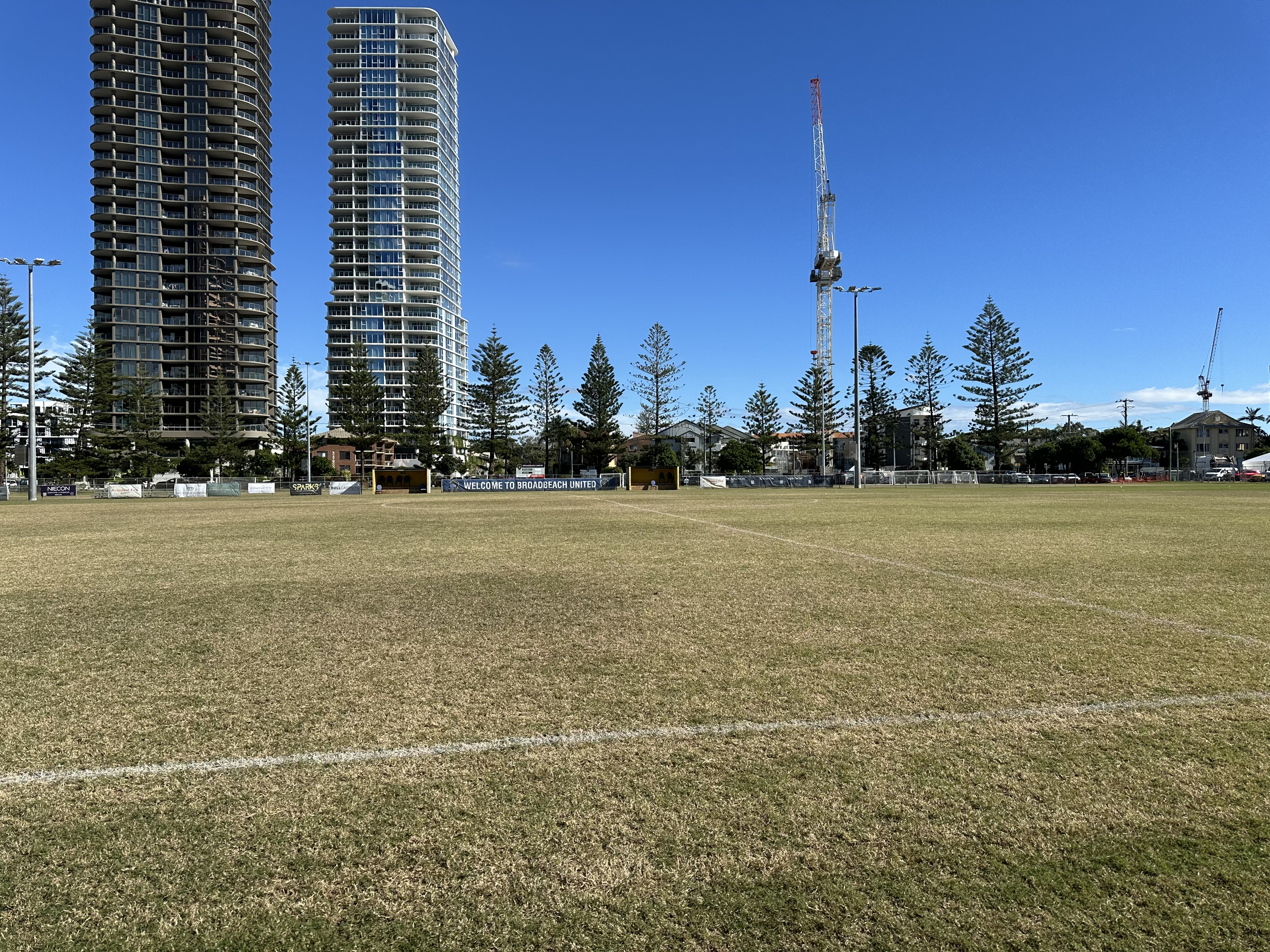
- Nikiforides Family Park in June 2026
- Interactive map of Nikiforides Family Park
- Address: 25 Broadbeach Bvd; Broadbeach, Queensland
- Coordinates: 28.02191°S 153.43194°E
- Public transit: Florida Gardens; Broadbeach North; Old Burleigh Rd

Nikiforides Family Park (also known as Broadbeach Park) is a soccer venue located in the Gold Coast suburb of Broadbeach. It is the home ground of Broadbeach United SC, which competes in the Football Queensland Premier League (FQPL).

The venue is proposed to be redeveloped into a temporary stadium that would host beach volleyball and blind football for the Olympics and Paralympics respectively in 2032.

== History ==
The venue includes one full-sized pitch and one smaller pitch, as well as two additional areas for junior football matches, with a pavilion overlooking the pitch. It was renamed to Nikiforides Family Park on 4 March 2013 in honour of the Nikiforides family and their work in the development and construction industry in the Broadbeach area.

On 21 July 2021, Brisbane was approved by the International Olympic Committee (IOC) as the host of the 2032 Summer Olympics and Paralympics. Six venues on the Gold Coast were included on the list of venues for the Games, including Nikiforides Family Park, which would be redeveloped into a temporary stadium known as Broadbeach Park Stadium. The stadium would have a capacity of 12,000 people, hosting beach volleyball at the Olympics and blind (5-a-side) football at the Paralympics. As of March 2025, details of the redevelopment have not been confirmed by the Queensland Government or the Gold Coast City Council.

== Transport access ==
Nikiforides Family Park is primarily serviced by the G:link light rail line, with Florida Gardens and Broadbeach North stations located within walking distance of the venue. Bus route 703 stops on Old Burleigh Road near the venue.
