= Football Queensland Premier League 3 – South Coast =

Football Queensland Premier League 3 − South Coast
- Organising body: Football South Coast; Football Queensland
- Founded: 1975; 51 years ago 1991; 35 years ago (rebranded as Gold Coast Premier League); 2022; 4 years ago (rebranded as FQPL 3 − South Coast)
- Country: Australia
- State: QLD (9 teams)
- Other club from: NSW (2 teams)
- Confederation: AFC
- Number of clubs: 12
- Level on pyramid: 5
- Promotion to: Football Queensland Premier League 2 (via play-offs)
- Relegation to: Football Queensland Premier League 4 − South Coast
- Domestic cup(s): Australia Cup; President's Cup (discontinued)
- Current champions: Kingscliff Wolves (3rd title) (2026)
- Current premiers: Burleigh Heads Bulldogs (7th title) (2026)
- Most championships: Broadbeach United (14 titles)
- Most premierships: Broadbeach United (11 titles)
- Website: fqsouthcoast.com.au
- Current: 2026 FQPL 3 − South Coast

The Football Queensland Premier League 3 − South Coast, or the FQPL 3 − South Coast, is a men's football competition contested by clubs on the Gold Coast and surrounding areas close to the Queensland−New South Wales border in Australia. It is administered by Football Queensland South Coast and it is within the fourth tier of football in Queensland, operated by a system of promotion and relegation. The league is contested by 11 clubs each season, the team that finishes at the top of the league is crowned premiers and they qualify for the FQPL 2 play-offs, whilst the bottom three teams are relegated to the Football Queensland Premier League 4 − South Coast. The teams that finish in the top four qualify for a finals tournament, where the winners of the bracket are crowned champions.

The competition was founded in 1975, with the first season held in the same year. The competition from 1975 to 1990 had no title and simply acted as the Gold Coast's senior men's football competition, in 1991 the competition was named The Gold Coast Premier League. In 2021, Football Queensland announced a new state system adjustment which would see the league renamed to the current name and an opportunity every season for the premiers to compete for a place in the FQPL 2.

Currently the league consists of 10 teams from Queensland and 2 teams from New South Wales. Twelve teams have won the premiership and twelve teams have won the championship. The most successful team in the competition is Broadbeach United with 11 premierships and 14 championships. Southport are the current premiers and Palm Beach are the current champions.

== Clubs ==
=== 2025 season ===
Club	State	Location	Stadium	Founded
Coomera Colts	(Queensland)	Coomera	Viney Park	1983
Burleigh Heads Bulldogs	(Queensland)	Miami	Pizzey Park	1983
Gold Coast Knights Reserves	(Queensland)	Gold Coast	Croatian Sports Centre	1978
Kingscliff Wolves	(New South Wales)	Kingscliff	Murphys Road	1978
Mudgeeraba	(Queensland)	Mudgeeraba	Sid Bigg Park	1980
Musgrave Mustangs	(Queensland)	Labrador	Keith Hunt Park	1970
Ormeau FC All Stars	(Queensland)	Ormeau	Norfolk Park	2013
Palm Beach	(Queensland)	Palm Beach	Duncan McKenna Field	1966
Runaway Bay Hawks	(Queensland)	Runaway Bay	Runaway Bay Sports Complex	1977
Southport Warriors	(Queensland)	Southport	Ashmore Park	1976
Surfers Paradise Apollo	(Queensland)	Gold Coast	Lex Bell Oval	1978
Tweed United	(New South Wales)	Tweed Heads	Arkinstall Park	2012

== Honours ==
=== By team ===
Seasons in bold indicate doubles with both the respective premiership and championship in a single season.

Club	Premierships	Championships	Premiership winning seasons	Championship winning seasons
Broadbeach United	11	14	**1976**, 1985, **1991**, **1995**, 1999, 2005, **2009**, 2011, **2014**, 2016, **2022**	**1976**, 1977, 1980, **1991**, 1992, **1995**, 2006, **2009**, 2010, 2012, 2013, **2014**, 2017, **2022**
Burleigh Heads	7	5	2001, **2004**, 2006, **2007**, **2019**, 2025, 2026	2003, **2004**, **2007**, 2008, **2019**
Palm Beach	6	8	1988, 1992, **1993**, **1994**, **1997**, 2010	1984, 1985, **1993**, **1994**, **1997**, 1998, 2005, 2023
Southport Warriors / Southport	6	7	**1987**, **1989**, **1990**, **1996**, 1998, 2023	**1987**, 1988, **1989**, **1990**, **1996**, 2011, 2021
Merrimac / Merrimac International	5	4	**1982**, **1983**, **1986**, 2000, 2012	**1982**, **1983**, **1986**, 1999
Gold Coast Knights / St Anthony Croatia	5	1	1984, 2003, 2008, 2017, **2018**	**2018**
Twin Towns / Tugan Jets	4	2	1977, **1978**, **1979**, 1980	**1978**, **1979**
Surfers Paradise Apollo	3	3	**2002**, **2020,** 2021	**2002**, 2016, **2020**
Nerang Eagles	1	1	**1975**	**1975**
Musgrave Mustangs / Musgrave Hill	1	1	**1981**	**1981**
Magic United	1	1	**2015**	**2015**
Runaway Bay	0	2		2000, 2001
Murwillumbah	1	0	2013	
Robina City	1	0	2024	
Kingscliff Wolves	0	3		2024, 2025, 2026

=== By season ===
Season	Champions	Premiers	Top scorers	Goals
**1975**	Nerang Eagles	Nerang Eagles		
**1976**	Broadbeach United	Broadbeach United		
1977	Broadbeach United	Twin Towns		
**1978**	Twin Towns	Twin Towns		
**1979**	Twin Towns	Twin Towns		
1980	Broadbeach United	Twin Towns		
**1981**	Musgrave Hill	Musgrave Hill		
**1982**	Merrimac International	Merrimac International		
**1983**	Merrimac International	Merrimac International	Brian Lampitt (Merrimac International)	26
1984	Palm Beach	St Anthony Croatia	Rick Mangan (Merrimac International)	25
1985	Palm Beach	Broadbeach United	Darryl Brownlie (Musgrave)	25
**1986**	Merrimac International	Merrimac International	Rick Mangan (Merrimac International)	22
**1987**	Southport	Southport	Rick Mangan (Merrimac International)	38
1988	Southport	Palm Beach	Craig Walsh (Musgrave)	15
**1989**	Southport	Southport	(New Zealand) Paul Halford (Southport)	22
**1990**	Southport	Southport	(Australia) Peter Dwyer (Musgrave)	27
**Gold Coast Premier League** (1991−2021)
**1991**	Broadbeach United	Broadbeach United	(Australia) Peter Dwyer (St Anthony Croatia)	28
1992	Broadbeach United	Palm Beach	A Lees (Palm Beach Sharks)	19
**1993**	Palm Beach	Palm Beach	Rodney Lumb (Palm Beach United)	18
**1994**	Palm Beach	Palm Beach	Alan Simseker (Southport)	10
**1995**	Broadbeach United	Broadbeach United	Craig Walsh (Robina City)	16
**1996**	Southport	Southport	Andy Monement (Broadbeach United); P Kelly (Southport)	16
**1997**	Palm Beach	Palm Beach	Glen Waddingham (Palm Beach Sharks)	18
1998	Palm Beach	Southport	(Australia) Peter Dwyer (Surfers Paradise Apollo)	31
1999	Merrimac International	Broadbeach United	(Australia) Chris Broadfoot (Broadbeach United) (Australia) Lee Vernon (Broadbeach United)	30
2000	Runaway Bay	Merrimac International	(Uruguay) Fraser Cuba (Surfers Paradise Apollo)	31
2001	Runaway Bay	Burleigh Heads	(Australia) Lee Vernon (Broadbeach United)	38
**2002**	Surfers Paradise Apollo	Surfers Paradise Apollo	(Australia) Peter Dwyer (Southport)	24
2003	Burleigh Heads	Gold Coast Knights	(Australia) Chris Broadfoot (Burleigh Heads Bulldogs)	27
**2004**	Burleigh Heads	Burleigh Heads	(Australia) Wade Russell (Burleigh Heads Bulldogs)	29
2005	Palm Beach	Broadbeach United	Jonno Merten (Mudgeeraba)	23
2006	Broadbeach United	Burleigh Heads	M Uchimura (Broadbeach United)	12
**2007**	Burleigh Heads	Burleigh Heads	(Australia) Shaun Robinson (Surfers Paradise Apollo)	32
2008	Burleigh Heads	Gold Coast Knights	(Australia) Luke Sleight (Gold Coast Knights) (Australia) Pat Cronin (Musgrave Mustangs)	14
**2009**	Broadbeach United	Broadbeach United	(Australia) Matt Hilton (Burleigh Heads Bulldogs)	24
2010	Broadbeach United	Palm Beach	(Australia) James Odenbreit (Southport)	21
2011	Southport	Broadbeach United	(Australia) James Odenbreit (Southport)	30
2012	Broadbeach United	Merrimac	(Australia) Shaun Robinson (Southport)	36
2013	Broadbeach United	Murwillumbah	(Australia) Luke Morley (Murwillumbah)	23
**2014**	Broadbeach United	Broadbeach United	(Australia) Luke Morley (Murwillumbah)	22
**2015**	Magic United	Magic United	(Australia) Robbie Smith (Magic United)	19
2016	Broadbeach United	Surfers Paradise Apollo	(Australia) Ethan Grimley (Broadbeach United)	25
2017	Broadbeach United	Gold Coast Knights	(Australia) Andrew Barisic (Gold Coast Knights)	27
**2018**	Gold Coast Knights	Gold Coast Knights	(Australia) Matt Hilton (Burleigh Heads Bulldogs)	26
**2019**	Burleigh Heads	Burleigh Heads	unknown	
**2020**	Surfers Paradise Apollo	Surfers Paradise Apollo	(Australia) Teddy Watson (Surfers Paradise Apollo)	15
2021	Surfers Paradise Apollo	Southport Warriors	(Uruguay) Bruno Rodriguez (Surfers Paradise Apollo)	19
**Football Queensland Premier League 3 − South Coast** (2022−)
**2022**	Broadbeach United	Broadbeach United		
**2023**	Palm Beach	Southport Warriors		
**2024**	Robina City	Kingscliff Wolves		
**2025**	Burleigh Heads	Kingscliff Wolves		
**2026**	Burleigh Heads			

== President's Cup ==
The President's Cup was a knockout football competition played between teams within the Gold Coast Premier League and the inaugural senior Gold Coast competition. The first edition was played in 1976 and the competition was discontinued following the 2006 edition. Below is a list of finals and champions. In an effort to reinstate the competition in 2021, an edition was held as a mid-season competition with Nerang Eagles crowing the latest edition.

=== By team ===
Club	Winners	Runner-up	Years champions	Years runner-up
Broadbeach United	9	6	1976, 1980, 1990, 1991, 1992, 1995, 1999, 2002, 2005	1977, 1978, 1979, 1985, 1987, 1996
Southport	6	4	1987, 1989, 1993, 1994, 1996, 2004	1990, 1997, 1998, 2005
Palm Beach Sharks	5	6	1978, 1985, 1988, 1997, 1998	1984, 1992, 1993, 1994, 1995, 2006
Gold Coast Knights / St Anthony Croatia	4	3	1981, 1984, 1986, 2003	1982, 1989, 1991
Burleigh Heads Bulldogs	2	2	2001, 2006	2003, 2004
Merrimac / Merrimac International	2	3	1982, 1983	1983, 1986, 1999
Surfers Paradise Apollo	1	2	2000	2002, 2021
Nerang Eagles	1	0	2021	
Twin Towns	1	0	1977	
Runaway Bay	0	2		2000, 2001
Kingscliff Wolves	0	1		1988

=== By season ===
Season	Winner	Score	Runner-up
1976	Broadbeach United		unknown
1977	Twin Towns		Broadbeach United
1978	Palm Beach Sharks		Broadbeach United
1979	unknown		Broadbeach United
1980	Broadbeach United		unknown
1981	St Anthony Croatia		unknown
1982	Merrimac International		St Anthony Croatia
1983	Merrimac International		Palm Beach Sharks
1984	St Anthony Croatia		Palm Beach Sharks
1985	Palm Beach Sharks		Broadbeach United
1986	St Anthony Croatia		Merrimac International
1987	Southport		Broadbeach United
1988	Palm Beach Sharks		Kingscliff Wolves
1989	Southport		St Anthony Croatia
1990	Broadbeach United		Southport
1991	Broadbeach United		St Anthony Croatia
1992	Broadbeach United	2−0	Palm Beach Sharks
1993	Southport	1−0	Palm Beach Sharks
1994	Southport	3−0	Palm Beach Sharks
1995	Broadbeach United	1−0	Palm Beach Sharks
1996	Southport	2−1	Broadbeach United
1997	Palm Beach Sharks	3−0	Southport
1998	Palm Beach Sharks	2−0	Southport
1999	Broadbeach United	2−0	Merrimac
2000	Surfers Paradise Apollo	4−2	Runaway Bay
2001	Burleigh Heads Bulldogs	4−1	Runaway Bay
2002	Broadbeach United	3−2	Surfers Paradise Apollo
2003	Gold Coast Knights	2−1	Burleigh Heads Bulldogs
2004	Southport	1−0	Burleigh Heads Bulldogs
2005	Broadbeach United	2−0	Southport
2006	Burleigh Heads Bulldogs	4−0	Palm Beach
2021	Nerang Eagles	3−3 (Note: Score was 3−3 after full time. Nerang Eagles won the penalty shootout 4−1.)	Surfers Paradise Apollo

== See also ==
- Football Queensland
- Football Queensland South Coast
- Football Queensland Premier League – Metro
- Football Queensland Premier League 3 − Darling Downs
- Football Queensland Premier League 3 − Sunshine Coast
- Football Queensland Premier League 4 − South Coast
