= Mudgeeraba S.C. =

Mudgeeraba
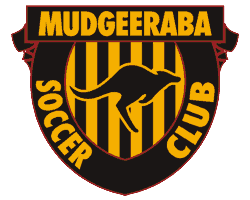
- Full name: Mudgeeraba Soccer Club
- Founded: 1980; 46 years ago
- Ground: Sid Bigg Park
- Motto: Fun, Family and Soccer Finesse
- President: Jon Smith
- League: FQPL 4 − South Coast
- 2021: Men's Coast League 1; 4th of 11
- Website: https://mudgeerabasoccer.com/

Mudgeeraba Soccer Club is a semi-professional soccer club based in Mudgeeraba, Queensland, Australia. The club competes in the Football Queensland Premier League 4 − South Coast, the second flight of the Football Queensland South Coast administrative division and the sixth flight of the Australian soccer league system.

The club's home ground is the Sid Bigg Park and since foundation in 1980, the club has been a regular competitor in the Gold Coast Premier League. However, the club currently competes in the second division, following relegation from the Gold Coast Premier League after the 2019 season. The club's senior men's team has won 1 First Division Premiership, 2 First Division Championships and 1 First Division President's Cup.

== History ==
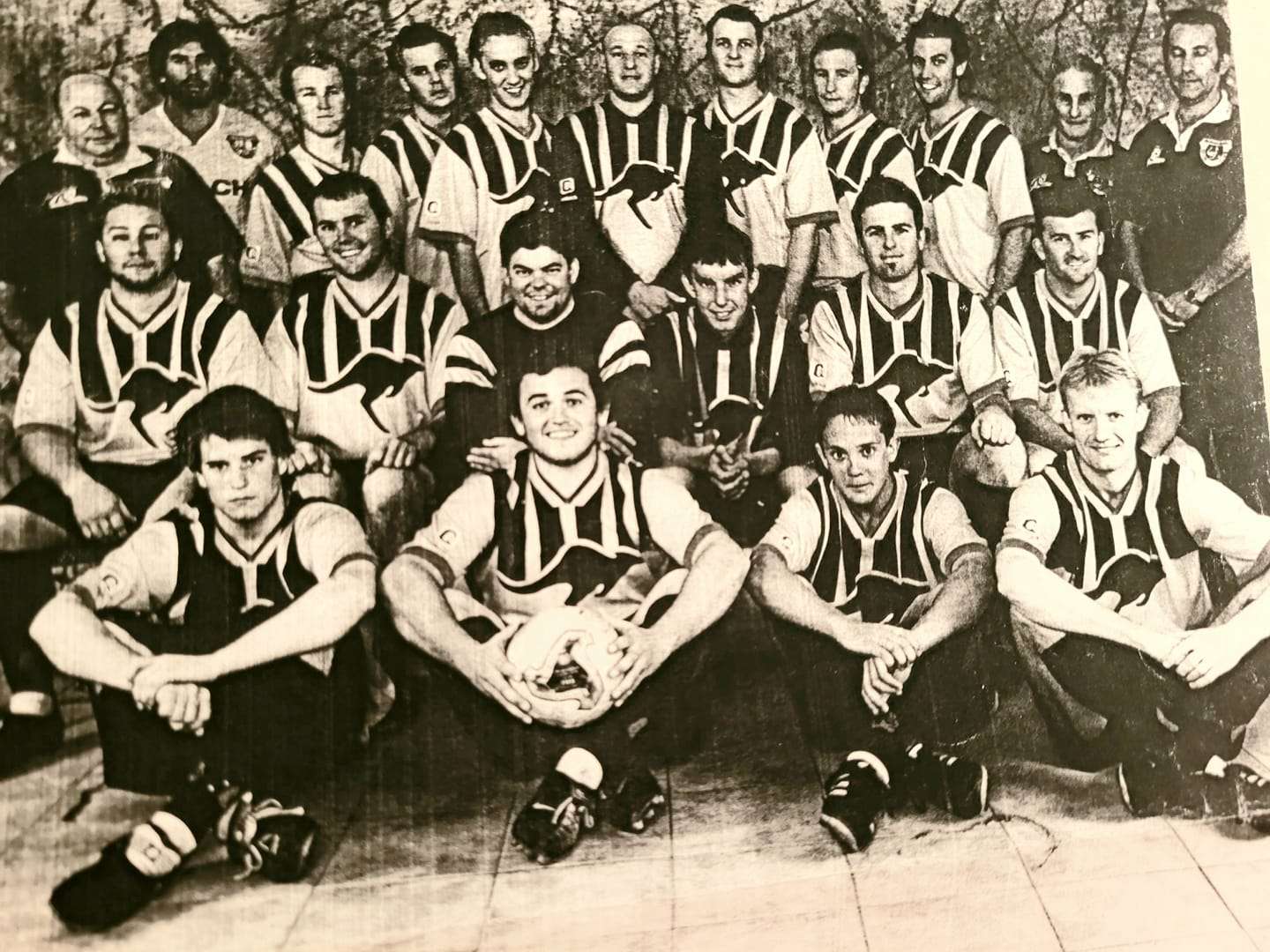
Mudgeeraba Soccer Club's 2003 Gold Coast Premier League side

With the interest of developing junior sport, an inaugural meeting of the Mudgeeraba Sports Club was held on 22 May 1979. Mudgeeraba Sports Club acquired a lease of Sid Bigg Park, where the club was able to foster Tennis, Table tennis and Cricket for foundation members.

In 1979, following a successful fundraising dinner, soccer was introduced and the first junior games were played in 1980. In 1986 a clubhouse was built, allowing for senior soccer to commence in 1987.

The senior men's team statistics are only traceable to the 2003 season of the Gold Coast Premier League, a period which has seen three relegations to the second division of Football South Coast, and two returning promotions. Mudgeeraba Soccer Club has various appearances in first and second division finals series and Australia Cup preliminary appearances.

== Seasons ==
=== Men's Senior Team ===
==== 1987–2013: President's Cup and First Division success ====
According to the club, senior football began in 1987. Mudgeeraba Soccer Club's earliest mention in records was when the First Division's top goalscorer, D.Mann, recorded 24 goals for the club in the 1998 season. This is because league tables were only available from 2003 onwards. The Men's senior team won their first trophy that was administered by Football Gold Coast (today known as Football Queensland South Coast) in the 1999 season after they won the First Division's championship. Mudgeeraba Soccer Club won their first First Division's President's Cup the following season. Following a spell in the Gold Coast Premier League, the club was relegated in 2009, and in 2011 the club won both the first division premiership and championship to return to the Gold Coast Premier League with the club's first double. The President's Cup was discontinued in 2008.

Season	League											Respective President's Cup
Season	Division (tier)	Pld	W	D	L	GF	GA	GD	Pts	Position	Finals Series	Respective President's Cup
1998	First Division (2)	Results not available										Placement; Unknown
1999	First Division (2)	Results not available									Champions	Placement; Unknown
2000	First Division (2)	Results not available									Runner-up	Champions
2001	First Division (2)	Results not available									Runner-up	Runner-up
2002		Results not available										Placement; Unknown
2003	Gold Coast Premier League (1)	22	10	1	11	44	57	-13	31	5th	DNQ	Placement; Unknown
2004	Gold Coast Premier League (1)	27	6	1	20	40	85	-45	19	9th	DNQ	Placement; Unknown
2005	Gold Coast Premier League (1)	27	5	9	13	37	53	-16	24	9th	DNQ	Placement; Unknown
2006	Gold Coast Premier League (1)	18	7	3	8	26	32	-6	24	6th	DNQ	Placement; Unknown
2007	Gold Coast Premier League (1)	27	6	6	15	27	61	-34	24	7th	DNQ	Placement; Unknown
2008	Gold Coast Premier League (1)	14	3	1	10	18	40	-22	10	10th	DNQ	President's Cup discontinued
2009	Gold Coast Premier League (1)	22	3	3	16	28	72	-44	12	12th ↓	DNQ	President's Cup discontinued
2010	First Division (2)	18	11	6	1	53	21	32	39	3rd	Elimination Final	President's Cup discontinued
2011	First Division (2)	18	13	1	4	45	14	30	40	1st ↑	Champions	President's Cup discontinued
2012	Gold Coast Premier League (1)	22	4	5	13	40	88	-48	17	10th	DNQ	President's Cup discontinued
2013	Gold Coast Premier League (1)	21	9	4	8	45	37	8	31	4th	Runner-up	President's Cup discontinued

Key:	Premiers / Champions	Promoted ↑	Relegated ↓

The tiers in the above table is the level according to The Football Queensland South Coast zone system, Sources

==== Since 2014: Establishment of FFA Cup and Mediocrity ====
The FFA Cup's first season was held in 2014 (known as the Australia Cup since 2022), giving a chance for clubs of small stature to compete at a state and national level. Mudgeeraba Soccer Club's first and best performance came in the 2015 season reaching the fourth round after beating Coomera Colts and Murwillumbah. Their FFA Cup run would end following a 2–0 defeat to Broadbeach United.

Season	League											FFA Cup / Australia Cup
Season	Division (tier)	Pld	W	D	L	GF	GA	GD	Pts	Position	Finals Series	FFA Cup / Australia Cup
2014	Gold Coast Premier League (1)	21	8	5	8	38	44	-6	29	4th	Runner-up	DNQ
2015	Gold Coast Premier League (1)	21	8	5	8	49	46	3	29	5th	DNQ	Preliminary Fourth Round
2016	Gold Coast Premier League (1)	21	2	1	18	26	68	-42	7	8th ↓	DNQ	Preliminary Second Round
2017	Men's Coast League 1 (2)	27	19	3	5	101	45	56	60	2nd ↑	Runner-up	DNQ
2018	Gold Coast Premier League (1)	18	1	1	16	13	69	-56	4	10th	DNQ	DNQ
2019	Gold Coast Premier League (1)	21	3	0	18	25	87	-62	9	7th ↓	DNQ	Preliminary Third Round
2020	Men's Coast League 1 (2)	12	4	1	7	23	41	-18	13	4th	Semi-finals	DNQ
2021	Men's Coast League 1 (2)	20	11	3	6	54	34	20	36	4th	Semi-finals	DNQ
2022	FQPL 4 − South Coast (2)											DNQ

Key:	Premiers / Champions	Promoted ↑	Relegated ↓

The tiers in the above table is the level according to The Football Queensland South Coast zone system, Sources

== Academy graduates ==
This is a list of former Mudgeeraba S.C. academy graduates who have gone on to represent their country at full international level.

=== Men ===
- (Scotland) Lyndon Dykes

=== Women ===
- (Australia) Tameka Yallop

== Honours ==
=== Football South Coast ===
- FQPL 3 − South Coast / Gold Coast Premier League (first tier)
  - Championship
    - Runner-up: 2013, 2014
- FQPL 4 − South Coast / Men's Coast League 1 / First Division (second tier)
  - Premiership
    - Winners (1): 2011
    - Runner-up: 2017
  - Championship
    - Winners (2): 1999, 2011
    - Runner-up: 2000, 2001, 2017
  - President's Cup
    - Winners (1): 2000
    - Runner-up: 2001

== See also ==
- Football Queensland South Coast
