= Murwillumbah SC =

Murwillumbah Soccer Club
- Full name: Murwillumbah Soccer Club
- Founded: 1954; 72 years ago
- Ground: Jim Devine Field
- Capacity: 1,000
- Chairman: Darren Mckay

Murwillumbah Soccer Club is a semi-professional soccer club based in New South Wales, Australia. The club was founded in 1954 and its home ground is the Jim Devine Field in the suburb of Murwillumbah. Despite the club being based in New South Wales, the club's senior men's side formally competed within the Gold Coast Premier League. The club last fielded a senior men's team within the Football Queensland competitions sometime within the late 2010s.

The club has been known under the names Murwillumbah Wanderers and Murwillumbah United.

== Honours ==
Seasons in bold indicate doubles with both the respective premiership and championship in a single season.

=== Football South Coast ===
- **Gold Coast Premier League** (first-tier)
  - Premiership
    - Winners (1): 2013
- **FQPL 2 − South Coast / Men's Coast League 1 / Division 1** (second-tier)
  - Premiership
    - Winners (3): 2005, 2012, 2022
  - Championship
    - Winners (2): 1988, 2012
