= Football Queensland South Coast =

- Formation: 1 October 1975; 51 years ago as Gold Coast and District Soccer Association
- Headquarters: Mudgeeraba, Gold Coast
- Zone manager: Alan Marquez
- Main organ: Football Australia; Football Queensland
- Website: Official website
- Formerly called: See antecedent bodies

Football Queensland South Coast is a Football Queensland administrative zone encompassing the Gold Coast and surrounding areas in South-East Queensland and North-East New South Wales, including Kingscliff, Tweed Heads, Murwillumbah and Beaudesert. The premier men's football competition is the Football Queensland Premier League 3 − South Coast and the premier women's football competition is the Football Queensland Women's Premier League 3 − South Coast. The administrative zone also has a numerous variety of lower divisions for both men and women, as well as academy and junior competitions to develop soccer and fitness within the region.

The zone is a culmination of antecedent bodies initiating in 1975 as the Gold Coast and District Soccer Association, it has been recognised under various names since. In 2021, as part of Football Queensland reforms, the zone would be known as Football Queensland South Coast. The region has a variety of clubs playing in state competitions. Many of the smaller clubs located within the region act as 'feeder' clubs for those in higher divisions, most notably with NPL Queensland sides Gold Coast United and Gold Coast Knights taking in the South Coast's best footballers. The zone previously encompassed A-League Men side (known at the time as A-League) Gold Coast United. However, the club was omitted from the competition in 2012 following club financial issues.

== History ==
The organisation was established on 1 October 1975 as the Gold Coast and District Soccer Association when Barry Such, a local referee, conducted an inaugural general meeting, adopting a constitution and electing Jack Woodward, a solicitor based in Coolangatta, as the association's first president. The association administered a top-flight men's football competition and in 1991, it was renamed to the Gold Coast Premier League. Following restructuring within Football Queensland in 2021, the senior men's and women's competitions were renamed and restructured to accommodate a new system of promotion and relegation within the state, allowing local clubs to compete at state level against teams from Brisbane, Darling Downs and the Sunshine Coast. As part of the reform process, the organisation sought to focus on improving four key areas of the game: Governance, Administration, Competitions and Affordability. The zone since establishment has focused on fostering and developing young Australians in the sport.

== Member Clubs ==
Teams in bold are playing within a Football Queensland state competition.

Club	Location	Est	2026 season	
Club	Location	Est	First men's senior	First women's senior
Bilambil Terranora Redbacks	(New South Wales) Bilambil	unk	Metro leagues	
Bond University	(Queensland) Gold Coast (Robina)	2004	Metro leagues	FQPL 3 − South Coast
Broadbeach United (Note: Formerly known as the Gold Coast Dolphins)	(Queensland) Gold Coast (Broadbeach)	1962	**FQPL 1**	**FQPL 2**
Burleigh Heads	(Queensland) Gold Coast (Burleigh Heads)	1983	FQPL 3 − South Coast	Metro leagues
Canungra Owls	(Queensland) Canungra	unk (Note: Ongoing effort to recover club history)	Metro leagues	
Coomera Colts	(Queensland) Gold Coast (Coomera)	1983	FQPL 3 − South Coast	FQPL 3 − South Coast
Gold Coast Knights (Note: Formally known as St Anthony Croatia)	(Queensland) Gold Coast	1978	**NPL QLD**	Metro leagues
Gold Coast United	(Queensland) Gold Coast	1966	**NPL QLD**	**NPL QLD**
Kingscliff Wolves	(New South Wales) Kingscliff	1968	FQPL 3 − South Coast	FQPL 3 − South Coast
Legends	(Queensland) Gold Coast (Labrador)	1985	FQPL 4 − South Coast	Metro leagues
Magic United	(Queensland) Gold Coast (Carrara)	2006	**NPL QLD**	FQPL 3 − South Coast
Merrimac (Note: Formally known as Merrimac International)	(Queensland) Gold Coast (Merrimac)	1978	Academy focused	
Mudgeeraba	(Queensland) Gold Coast (Mudgeeraba)	1980	FQPL 3 − South Coast	Metro leagues
Murwillumbah	(New South Wales) Murwillumbah	2009	Metro leagues	
Musgrave Mustangs (Note: Formally known as Musgrave Hill)	(Queensland) Gold Coast (Labrador)	1970	FQPL 3 − South Coast	FQPL 3 − South Coast
Nerang Eagles	(Queensland) Gold Coast (Nerang)	1972	FQPL 4 − South Coast	Metro leagues
Ormeau All Stars	(Queensland) Gold Coast (Ormeau)	2013	FQPL 3 − South Coast	Metro leagues
Pacific Pines	(Queensland) Gold Coast (Pacific Pines)	1991	FQPL 3 − South Coast	Metro leagues
Pimpama City	(Queensland) Gold Coast (Pimpama)	2021	FQPL 4 − South Coast	Metro leagues
Palm Beach (Note: Formerly known as Gold Coast City)	(Queensland) Gold Coast (Palm Beach)	1966	FQPL 3 − South Coast	FQPL 3 − South Coast
Robina City	(Queensland) Gold Coast (Robina)	1992	**FQPL 1**	**FQPL 2**
Runaway Bay	(Queensland) Gold Coast (Runaway Bay)	1977	FQPL 3 − South Coast	Metro leagues
Somerset College	(Queensland) Gold Coast (Mudgeeraba)	1983 (Note: College established in 1983, unclear when soccer was implemented at the college and associated with Football Gold Coast)	Academy focused	
Southport Warriors	(Queensland) Gold Coast (Southport)	1978	FQPL 4 − South Coast	Metro leagues
Surfers Paradise Apollo	(Queensland) Gold Coast (Surfers Paradise)	1978	FQPL 3 − South Coast	Metro leagues
Tallebudgera Valley	(Queensland) Gold Coast (Tallebudgera)	unk	FQPL 4 − South Coast	Metro leagues
Tamborine Mountain Eagles	(Queensland) Tamborine Mountain	unk	Metro leagues	
The Southport School	(Queensland) Gold Coast (Southport)	1901 (Note: College established in 1901, unclear when soccer and association with Football Gold Coast began)	Academy focused	N/A
Tweed United	(New South Wales) Tweed Heads	2012	FQPL 3 − South Coast	Metro leagues

=== Former clubs ===
Club	Location	Joined	Departed	Notes
Beaudesert	(Queensland) Beaudesert	1964	2008	Moved to Queensland Christian Soccer Association due to travel and low numbers.
Bethania Rams	(Queensland) Brisbane (Bethania)	1986	unk	Moved to Football Queensland Metro.
Banora Point	(New South Wales) Banora Point	unk	unk	Dissolved to form a part of Tweed United.
Coolangatta	(Queensland) Gold Coast (Coolangatta)	unk	unk	
Griffith University	(Queensland) Gold Coast (Southport)	unk	unk	
Gold Coast Stars	(Queensland) Gold Coast	2010	2012	Formed as part of the Queensland State League.
Japaroos	(Queensland) Gold Coast (Labrador)	unk	unk	
Jupiters Casino	(Queensland) Gold Coast (Broadbeach)	unk	unk	
Labrador United	(Queensland) Gold Coast (Labrador)	unk	unk	
Murwillumbah City	(New South Wales) Murwillumbah	unk	unk	Merged with Murwillumbah United and Wanderers to form Murwillumbah Services.
Murwillumbah Saints	(New South Wales) Murwillumbah	unk	2009	Merged with Murwillumbah Services to form Murwillumbah in 2009.
Murwillumbah Services	(New South Wales) Murwillumbah	unk	2009	Merged with Murwillumbah Saints to form Murwillumbah in 2009. (Note: Murwillumbah Saints was an amalgamation of Murwillumbah Wanderers, Murwillumbah United and Murwillumbah City.)
Murwillumbah United	(New South Wales) Murwillumbah	unk	unk	Merged with Murwillumbah City and Wanderers to form Murwillumbah Services.
Murwillumbah Wanderers	(New South Wales) Murwillumbah	unk	unk	Merged with Murwillumbah United and City to form Murwillumbah Services.
Musgrave Athletic	(Queensland) Gold Coast (Labrador)	unk	unk	
Musgrave Dynamoes	(Queensland) Gold Coast (Labrador)	unk	unk	
Musgrave Wanderers	(Queensland) Gold Coast (Labrador)	unk	unk	
Tugun Jets / Twin Towns (Note: Twin Towns left the State League and joined the Gold Coast 1st Division in 1983 and remained there until 1990 when they relocated to Tugun before losing their name a year later (1991).)	(Queensland) Gold Coast (Tugun) (New South Wales) Tweed Heads	1959	2014	Folded due to Tugun Seahawks expansion.
Tweed Valley Kings	(New South Wales) Murwillumbah	unk	unk	
United Eagles	(Queensland) Gold Coast (Labrador)	unk	unk	

== Football Queensland South Coast Pyramids ==
=== Men's Pyramid ===
The Football Queensland Premier League 3 − South Coast competition is the fourth tier in the Football Queensland pyramid and the fifth tier in the Australian pyramid. Each respective competition has its own reserve league primarily for senior academy players.

Tier	Competition	Current Premiers	Current Champions
1	Football Queensland Premier League 3 − South Coast (FQPL 3 − South Coast) (Premiers qualify for play-offs for promotion to FQPL 2, Bottom team relegated)	Southport Warriors	Palm Beach
2	Football Queensland Premier League 4 − South Coast (FQPL 4 − South Coast) (Premiers promoted, relegation upon Football South Coast discretion)	Broadbeach United	Ormeau FC
3−	Football Queensland South Coast Community Competitive Senior Leagues (additional amateur divisions)	Not Applicable	

=== Women's Pyramid ===
The Football Queensland Women's Premier League 3 − South Coast competition is the fourth tier in the Football Queensland pyramid and the fifth tier in the Australian pyramid. Each respective competition has its own reserve league primarily for senior academy players.

Tier	Competition	Current Premiers	Current Champions
1	Football Queensland Women's Premier League 3 − South Coast (FQPL 3 − South Coast) (Premiers qualify for play-offs for promotion to FQPL 2, Bottom team relegated)	Surfers Paradise Apollo	Surfers Paradise Apollo
2−	Football Queensland South Coast Community Competitive Senior Leagues (additional amateur divisions)	Not Applicable	

== Antecedent bodies ==
Duration	Organisation Name
1 October 1975 − 1985	Gold Coast and District Soccer Association
1985–1996	Gold Coast and Albert Soccer Federation
1996–2011	Gold Coast Soccer Incorporated
2012 − 7 August 2021	Football Gold Coast
7 August 2021−present	Football Queensland South Coast

== See also ==
- Football Queensland
- Football Australia
- Football Queensland Metro
