= Magic United F.C. =

Magic United
- Full name: Magic United Football Club
- Founded: 2006; 20 years ago
- Ground: Magic F.C. Park
- President: Adem Poric
- League: NPL Queensland
- 2025: 1st of 12, (champions, promoted) FQPL
- Website: https://magicunited.com.au

Magic United Football Club is a semi-professional soccer club based in Carrara, Queensland, Australia. Magic United play in the NPL Queensland, the first flight of the Football Queensland administrative division and the second flight of Australian soccer. The club has won both a premiership and a championship within the Gold Coast Premier League, the then top flight of the Football Queensland South Coast administrative division. The competition has since been restructured and renamed to the Football Queensland Premier League 3 − South Coast.

Established in 2006, Magic United were regular contenders within the Gold Coast Premier League. The club was one of the founding members of the Football Queensland Premier League 2 when the league was established in 2021.

The club is affiliated with Gold Coast Knights, together forming a 'Total Football Academy', specialising in coaching programs for children and teenagers aged 4 to 18 in partnership with schools across South East Queensland.

The Magic First Team 2025 is Coached by Brett Budwee, A Former Manchester City Apprentice.

== Honours ==
=== Football Queensland ===
- Football Queensland Premier League (second tier)
  - Premiership
    - Winners: 2025
  - Championship
    - Winners: 2025
- Football Queensland Premier League 2 (third tier)
  - Championship
    - Winners (2): 2023, 2024

=== Football South Coast ===
- Gold Coast Premier League (first tier)
  - Premiership
    - Winners (1): 2015
  - Championship
    - Winners (1): 2015

== See also ==
- Football Queensland
- Football Queensland South Coast
