= Sunshine Coast Wanderers FC =

Australian soccer club

- Full name: Sunshine Coast Wanderers Football Club
- Founded: 1972 (as Buderim Wanderers)
- Ground: Ballinger Park
- League: FQPL
- 2025: 12th of 12 NPL Queensland (relegated)
- Website: https://www.wanderersfootball.com.au/

Sunshine Coast Wanderers FC is an Australian football club based in the Buderim, Queensland, Australia that plays in the second tier NPL Queensland. The club was founded in 1972 as Buderim Wanderers FC. They continue to operate teams in the lower divisions under the name Buderim Wanderers FC.

== Club information ==
The club was founded in 1972 as Buderim Wanderers FC and is the largest club on the Sunshine Coast. In 1985, the club won the Fenn Cup, becoming Premiers, won the Sunshine Coast Soccer Association Championship and won the Qantas Cup. In the early 1990s, they won the Sunshine Coast Soccer Association Champion Club for five consecutive years and have been awarded the Sunshine Coast Champion Club of the Year seven consecutive times, from 2013 to 2019.

In 2018, Buderim Wanderers established the Sunshine Coast Wanderers as they were granted a license to enter teams in the second-tier NPL Queensland, in female division. After winning the 2019 Football Queensland Premier League, the male team was promoted to the second-tier NPL Queensland for the 2020 season. They continue to operate teams in the lower divisions under the name Buderim Wanderers FC.

== Seasons - Men ==
Season	League									
Season	Name (national level)	Pld	W	D	L	GF	GA	GD	Pts	Position
2018	Queensland Premier League (3)	24	13	5	6	55	27	+28	44	5th
2019	Queensland Premier League (3)	18	13	2	3	52	23	+29	41	1st
2020	NPL Queensland (2)	24	7	4	13	41	55	-14	25	9th
2021	NPL Queensland (2)									
2023	NPL Queensland (2)	22	8	5	9	26	34	-8	29	8th
