= Southport Warriors S.C. =

Southport Warriors
- Full name: Southport Warriors Soccer Club
- Nickname: Warriors
- Founded: 1976; 50 years ago
- Ground: Ashmore Village Park
- Chairman: Cheyne Young
- Manager: Steve MacDonald
- League: FQPL 4 − South Coast
- 2024: FQPL 3 − South Coast; 12th of 12 (relegated)

Southport Warriors Soccer Club is a semi-professional soccer club based in Southport, Queensland, Australia. The club play in the Football Queensland Premier League 3 − South Coast, the top flight of the Football Queensland South Coast administrative division. The club has won 5 premierships, 7 championships and 6 President's Cups (top flight cups), with a variety of second division honours.

Founded in 1976, the Southport Warriors have been a regular contender within senior competitions and they were a founding member of both the Gold Coast Premier League in 1991, and the reformed streamline Football Queensland pyramid in 2022. The club's home ground is the Ashmore Village Park, perpendicular with Ashmore State School.

The vision of the club is "to be a club that our members and community are proud of and want to be a part of".

== Honours ==
=== Football South Coast ===
- FQPL 3 − South Coast / Gold Coast Premier League (first tier)
  - Premiership
    - Winners (5): 1987, 1989, 1990, 1996, 1998
  - Championship
    - Winners (7): 1987, 1988, 1989, 1990, 1996, 2011, 2021
  - President's Cup
    - Winners (6): 1987, 1989, 1993, 1994, 1996, 2004
- FQPL 4 − South Coast / Men's Coast League 1 / First Division (second tier)
  - Premiership
    - Winners (1): 1992
  - Championship
    - Winners (1): 1992
  - President's Cup
    - Winners (1): 1992
