= Football Queensland Premier League =

- Founded: 2017; 9 years ago
- First season: 2018
- Country: Australia
- State: Queensland
- Confederation: AFC
- Number of clubs: 24: Division 1: 12; Division 2: 12
- Level on pyramid: 4 and 5 (notionally)
- Promotion to: National Premier Leagues Queensland
- Relegation to: FQPL – Darling Downs; FQPL – Metro; FQPL – South Coast; FQPL – Sunshine Coast
- Domestic cup: Australia Cup
- Current champions: Magic United (FQLD 1) (2025); Robina City (FQLD 2) (2025)
- Current premiers: Magic United (FQLD 1) (2025); Robina City (FQLD 2) (2025)
- Most championships: 8 teams (1 title each)
- Most premierships: 8 teams (1 title each)
- Broadcasters: FQTV; YouTube
- Website: footballqueensland.com

The Football Queensland Premier League (known by its abbreviation FQPL) is a men's soccer league contested by clubs in Queensland, Australia that consists of two divisions; FQPL 1 and FQPL 2. It is administered by Football Queensland and runs as the second and third tiers of football in Queensland, operated by a system of promotion and relegation. The league is contested by 12 clubs in each division each season, the team that finishes at the top of the league is crowned premiers and they are promoted to the Queensland National Premier League for Division 1 clubs, whilst the bottom three teams are relegated to Division 2. The teams that finish in the top four qualify for a finals tournament, where the winners of the bracket are crowned FQPL champions.

The FQPL 1 was founded in 2017, with the first season held in 2018. There was previously there was no second-tier statewide competition, instead there was only the Brisbane Premier League and subsequent Capital leagues which were the highest level of football competition in the state. FQPL 2 was founded in 2020, with the first season held in 2021.

The current champions and premiers are Brisbane City, crowning the 2021 season and earning promotion to the 2022 season of the Queensland National Premier League.

== History ==
In May 2017, Football Queensland confirmed the creation of the new competition and the teams to take part in the 2018 season. Peninsula Power were both premiers and champions of the inaugural Football Queensland Premier league, earning promotion into the 2019 NPL Queensland season along with runner-up team Capalaba.

Following the foundation of the FQPL 1 in 2017, Football Queensland sought to extend and link the footballing pyramid in Queensland to a third tier. At the time, there was only regional leagues across Queensland representing a 'third tier' in Queensland and a 'fourth tier' across Australia. In late 2020, the idea of a third league of Queensland football was proposed and 29 teams expressed interest in joining. In November 2020, 15 teams from South-East Queensland submitted formal FQPL 2 applications and on the 25th of November 2020, Football Queensland announced that eight teams would participate in the inaugural FQPL 2 season beginning 2021. The 8 inaugural members of the new Football Queensland Premier league 2 were:

- Caboolture Sports
- Coomera Colts
- Grange Thistle
- Magic United
- North Star
- Samford Rangers
- Taringa Rovers
- Virginia United

The inaugural season of the FQPL 2 saw Caboolture Sports clinching the premiership, earning promotion to the 2022 FQPL 1. However, Grange Thistle won the championship from them in a 3–1 win over the premiers. In August 2021, Football Queensland announced that all its competitions would be temporarily suspended due to the COVID-19 pandemic. As a result, the inaugural season experienced delays which would not affect the validity competition.

In March 2020 and again in August 2021, Football Queensland announced that all its competitions would be temporarily suspended due to the COVID-19 pandemic in Australia. In 2021, Football Queensland announced that Albany Creek Excelsior from Football Queensland Metro and Surfers Paradise Apollo from Football Queensland South Coast would join the Football Queensland Premier League 2 for the 2022 season. These teams would join the competition along with Wynnum Wolves, Holland Park Hawks and Souths United, who were the first teams relegated from the Football Queensland Premier League. Additionally, the 2022 season would see an introduction of a form of relegation where the worst performing team would be relegated out of the competition and back into their respective top-flight regional competition in South East Queensland. The regional zones as part of this streamline conference include South Coast, Darling Downs, Metro and Sunshine Coast, with the other zones located too far geographically to be sustainable. The 2022 season would have 12 clubs compete, the teams placed in 11th and 12th would be relegated to their respective FQPL 3 competition, and the teams placed 1st and 2nd would be promoted to the FQPL. The team that would place third would enter a playoff competition with the 10th placed team in the FQPL for a place in the competition for the following season.

In the 2023 season, Broadbeach United set the record for the highest points tally by a team in an FQPL 2 season, amassing 53 points as they won the premiership. The next season, in 2024, Holland Park Hawks also achieved a points total of 53, equaling Broadbeach's record.

== Format ==
The season consists of a regular season in which all clubs play each other twice, home and away. At the conclusion of the regular season the top of the table club progresses into the National Premier Leagues Queensland for the following season. Additionally, at the conclusion of the regular season the top four clubs play a local finals series. The local finals series consists of two semi-finals and a final. In the local finals series the top of the ladder club plays the fourth place and second place plays third. The winner of these local semi finals play each other in the Football Queensland Premier League Grand Finale.

== Current members ==
=== Division 1 ===
The following 12 clubs are participating in the 2026 season:

Club	City	Stadium	Founded	Joined	Head Coach
Brisbane Strikers	Brisbane	Perry Park	1994	2022	Kevin Aherne-Evans
Broadbeach United	Gold Coast	Nikiforides Family Park	1963	2024	Leighton Speechley-Price
Caboolture Sports	Moreton Bay	Moreton Bay Central Sports Complex	1969	2022	Paul Arnison
Capalaba FC	Redlands	John Frederick Park	1972	2018	Danny Gnjidic
Holland Park Hawks	Brisbane	Whites Hill Reserve	1977	2025	Luke DeVere
Ipswich FC	Ipswich	Briggs Rd Sporting Complex	2024	2024	James Baty
Logan Lightning	Logan	Cornubia Park	2011	2018	Grae Piddick
North Star	Brisbane	O'Callaghan Park	1958	2021	Lee Cunningham
Redlands United	Redlands	Compass Grounds	1918	2025	Graham Fyfe
Robina City	Robina	Robina Common	1992	2026	
SWQ Thunder	Toowoomba	Clive Berghofer Stadium	2012	2020	Mike Mulvey
Sunshine Coast Wanderers	Sunshine Coast	Ballinger Park	2017	2020	Nick Green
St George Willawong	Brisbane	St George's Park	2010	2024	

=== Division 2 ===
Club	City	Stadium	Founded	Joined	Head Coach
Brisbane Knights	Rocklea	Croatian Sports Centre	1957	2025	
Grange Thistle	Brisbane	Lanham Park	1920	2021	Glen Volker
Maroochydore FC	Sunshine Coast	Kunda Park	1968	2022	
Mitchelton	Brisbane	Teralba Park	1920	2025	Jason Poggi
Moreton City Excelsior Reserves	Moreton Bay	Wolter Park	1963	2023	Steve Glockner
North Lakes United	Moreton Bay	Kinsellas Park	2022	2023	
Pine Hills	Brisbane	James Drysdale Oval	1984	2024	
Samford Rangers	Moreton Bay	Samford Parklands	1973	2021	Paul Brownlie
Southside Eagles	Brisbane	Memorial Park	1968	2026	Sam Gahan
Souths United	Brisbane	Wakerley Park	1961	2022	Vederin Becirbegovic
Taringa Rovers	Brisbane	Jack Speare Park	1949	2021	Marco Ahlrichs
Virginia United	Brisbane	Albert Bishop Park	1970	2021	

== Honours ==
=== 2018–2020 ===
Season	Champions	Premiers
2018	Peninsula Power	Peninsula Power
2019	Rochedale Rovers	Sunshine Coast Wanderers
2020	Logan Lightning	Logan Lightning

=== 2021–present ===
Champions
Season	Division 1	Division 2
2021	Brisbane City	Grange Thistle
2022	Redlands United	Surfers Paradise Apollo
2023	Wynnum Wolves	Magic United
2024	Eastern Suburbs	Magic United
2025	Magic United	Robina City

Premiers
Season	Division 1	Division 2
2021	Brisbane City	Caboolture
2022	Redlands United	Surfers Paradise Apollo
2023	Surfers Paradise Apollo	Broadbeach United
2024	St George Willawong	Holland Park Hawks
2025	Magic United	Robina City

== Awards ==
=== Golden Boot ===
Year	FQPL 1			FQPL 2		
Year	Winner	Club	Goals	Winner	Club	Goals
2018	(Australia) Youeil Shol	Eastern Suburbs	35	—		
2019	(Australia) Jeremy Stewart	Sunshine Coast Wanderers	21	—		
2020	(Chinese Taipei) Yuta Hirayama	Western Pride	16	—		
2021	(Japan) Shuto Kuboyama	Mitchelton	16	(Australia) Sean Karambasis	Taringa Rovers	19
2022	(Czech Republic) Marek Madle (Australia) Guilherme Santana	Rochedale Rovers; Redlands United	18	Teddy Watson	Surfers Paradise Apollo	30

=== Player of the Year ===
Year	FQPL 1			FQPL 2		
Year	Winner	Club	Ref.	Winner	Club	Ref.
2018	(Australia) Youeil Shol	Eastern Suburbs		—		
2018	(Japan) Ryo Ono	Capalaba FC		—		
2019	(Australia) Jeremy Stewart	Sunshine Coast Wanderers		—		
2020	(Australia) Matthew Green	Logan Lightning				
2021	(Australia) Scott Halliday	Brisbane City		(Australia) Tom Baresic	Samford Rangers	
2022	(Italy) Mirko Crociati	SWQ Thunder		Jacob Krayem	Wynnum Wolves	

=== Young Player of the Year ===
Year	FQPL 1			FQPL 2		
Year	Winner	Club	Ref.	Winner	Club	Ref.
2018	(Australia) Zander Guy	Logan Lightning		—		
2019	(Australia) Jed Brown	Logan Lightning		—		
2020	(Australia) Maximilian Mikkola	Wynnum Wolves		—		
2021	(Australia) Jacob Krayem	Wynnum Wolves		(Australia) Tom Baresic	Samford Rangers	
2022	(Australia) Oli Williams	Sunshine Coast		Jacob Krayem	Wynnum Wolves	
2023	Luke Broderick	Brisbane Strikers		Will Gullo	North Star	
2024	Kai Flemington	Eastern Suburbs		Lewis Doci	Holland Park Hawks	

=== Coach of the Year ===
Year	FQPL 1			FQPL 2		
Year	Winner	Club	Ref.	Winner	Club	Ref.
2018	(Australia) Aaron Philp	Peninsula Power		—		
2019	(Australia) Scott MacNicol	Rochedale Rovers		—		
2020	(Australia) Rick Coghlan	Logan Lightning		—		
2021	(Australia) Matt Smith	Brisbane City		(Australia) Terry Kirkham	Caboolture Sports	
2022	(England) Graham Harvey	Redlands United		Alex Morrison	Surfers Paradise Apollo	

=== Goalkeeper of the Year ===
Year	Winner	Club	Ref.
2018	(Australia) Denver Crickmore	Sunshine Coast Wanderers	
2019	(Australia) Chris Parsons	Ipswich Knights	
2020	(Australia) Zayne Freiberg	Ipswich Knights	
2021	(Australia) Duro Dragicevic	Brisbane City	
2022	(Australia) Jerrad Tyson	Sunshine Coast	

=== Fair Play Award ===
Year	FQPL 1		FQPL 2	
Year	Winner	Ref.	Winner	Ref.
2018	not awarded		—	
2019	Southside Eagles		—	
2020	Ipswich Knights		—	
2021	Ipswich Knights		Samford Rangers	
2022	not awarded		Virginia United	

== See also ==
- National Premier Leagues Queensland
- Football Queensland
