= Surfers Paradise Apollo S.C. =

Surfers Paradise Apollo
- Full name: Surfers Paradise Apollo Soccer Club
- Nickname: Apollo
- Founded: 1978; 48 years ago
- Ground: Lex Bell Oval
- Chairman: Jimmy Gelagotis
- Manager: David Benigno
- League: FQLD 3 – South Coast
- 2026: 5th of 12
- Website: https://www.facebook.com/SurfersParadiseApollo

Surfers Paradise Apollo Soccer Club is a semi-professional soccer club based in Surfers Paradise, Queensland, Australia. The club currently plays in the FQPL 3 − South Coast competition, the fourth flight of men's soccer in Queensland and the fifth flight of Australian soccer.

== History ==
Greek-Australian Bert Voutos founded the Apollo Soccer Club in 1978 after failed attempts to convince the Gold Coast Greek Committee to buy/lease grounds and form a soccer club. The team was initially based at Sir Bruce Small Park in Benowa and shared tenancy with the Surfers Paradise Demons Australian rules football club. The Apollo club relocated to the TAFE Ashmore campus before eventually settling on the Isle of Capri and established facilities at Lex Bell Oval. The club was then renamed the Surfers Paradise Apollo Soccer Club as their new facilities were based close to the suburb of Surfers Paradise.

The club won their first top tier honour after winning the Gold Coast Premier League President's Cup in 2000. The first Premiership title came in 2002 with the club securing both a Premiership and Championship.

In 2006 and 2007 the club made back to back finals appearances, falling short against Burleigh Heads and Gold Coast Knights respectively. This led to some down years at the club which eventually resulted in relegation to the Coast League One competition after the 2011 campaign.

After spending a season in the second-tier competition, veteran coach Keith Garland returned to the club and guided them to a highly successful 2013 season, securing a Premiership, Championship and promotion back into the Gold Coast Premier League for the first time since 2011.

In 2015, David Benigno took over from Keith Garland which led to the most successful period in the club's history. The club returned to finals football falling narrowly short in a penalty shoot out against Broadbeach.

In 2016, Surfers Paradise Apollo qualified the FFA Cup for the first time. They defeated Gold Coast Knights, Magic United, Gold Coast City, South West Queensland Thunder and Sunshine Coast to reach the round of 32, where they were defeated by Canberra Olympic 1−0 away at the Deakin Stadium in Canberra. Apollo won their first major trophy since 2002, securing a Championship victory over Murwillumbah 3–1 at Nikiforides Park.

The 2017 season saw Apollo take a lead at the top of the competition, only to finish 3rd and bow out in the first week of finals against Burleigh Heads, marking the end of Benigno's first grade coaching tenure.

In the 2017 off-season, ex-player Alex Morrison joined the club after leaving the 2017 Champions Gold Coast Knights which would mark a significant turn of events for the club. In the 2018 season, Apollo fell short of a Grand Final berth after losing in a penalty shoot out to eventual double winners Gold Coast Knights at the Croatian Sports Centre.

The 2019 season saw Apollo go head to head with Burleigh Heads throughout the entire season, however the club would fall short in both a Premiership and Championship chase to the Bulldogs.

The 2020 season marked the first of four consecutive Premiership victories across three different competitions for the blue and white. In a COVID-19 shortened season, Apollo secured the double for the second time in their history, this time accomplishing the feat undefeated.

Following restructuring within Football Queensland competitions, the regional pyramids would be connected directly together to form a variety of streamline state conferences beginning in the 2022 season. After securing a back to back Premiership as the 2021 Gold Coast Premier League premiers, the club defeated Sunshine Coast premiers Nambour Yandina United 4−1 and Brisbane Premier League premiers Bayside United 8−2 in the Football Queensland Premier League 2 play-offs to earn promotion into the competition.

In their first season at the FQPL 2 level, Apollo lead from the start to the end of the season, securing a third consecutive Premiership along with a Championship. The club was subsequently promoted into the FQPL 1 competition for the 2023 season.

After a slow start, Apollo surged towards their fourth consecutive Premiership and promotion into the NPL 2024 season. The club fell short in the Championship final, losing to Wynnum Wolves at Suncorp Stadium. Despite a highly successful run for four consecutive seasons on the field, the club made the difficult decision to withdraw from the NPL 2024 due to financial constraints and returned to the FQPL 3 South Coast competition.

As a result of the withdrawal from the NPL 2024, head coach Alex Morrison departed the club with an impressive 68% win record, four Premierships, two Championships and three consecutive promotions on his record. David Benigno took over as Head Coach after guiding the U23's to back to back double winning seasons also in the FQPL 2 and FQPL 1 competitions for the 2024 season.

=== List of seasons ===
Season	League											FFA Cup / Australia Cup
Season	Division (tier)	Pld	W	D	L	GF	GA	GD	Pts	Position	Finals Series	FFA Cup / Australia Cup
2003	Gold Coast Premier League (1)	22	6	1	15	35	54	-19	19	10th	DNQ	
2004	Gold Coast Premier League (1)	27	7	2	18	45	79	-34	23	8th	DNQ	
2005	Gold Coast Premier League (1)	27	10	9	8	30	31	-1	39	6th	DNQ	
2006	Gold Coast Premier League (1)	18	8	5	5	30	29	1	29	4th	Semi-final	
2007	Gold Coast Premier League (1)	27	16	2	9	77	37	40	50	3rd	Semi-final	
2008	Gold Coast Premier League (1)	14	5	3	6	26	33	-7	18	7th	DNQ	
2009	Gold Coast Premier League (1)	22	7	4	11	52	39	13	25	7th	DNQ	
2010	Gold Coast Premier League (1)	22	7	1	14	32	54	−22	22	9th	DNQ	
2011	Gold Coast Premier League (1)	22	0	1	21	11	103	−92	1	12th ↓	DNQ	
2012	Men's Coast League 1 (2)	18	8	3	7	49	45	4	27	5th	DNQ	
2013	Men's Coast League 1 (2)	21	16	1	4	60	24	36	49	1st ↑	Champions	
2014	Gold Coast Premier League (1)	21	7	5	9	41	47	−6	26	6th	DNQ	DNQ
2015	Gold Coast Premier League (1)	21	9	6	6	53	39	14	33	3rd	Preliminary final	Second round
2016	Gold Coast Premier League (1)	21	11	7	3	46	25	21	40	2nd	Champions	Round of 32
2017	Gold Coast Premier League (1)	21	14	2	5	51	25	26	44	3rd	Semi-Final	Fourth round
2018	Gold Coast Premier League (1)	18	9	4	5	38	18	20	31	4th	Preliminary final	Third round
2019	Gold Coast Premier League (1)	21	14	2	5	80	27	53	44	2nd	Runner-up	Seventh round
2020	Gold Coast Premier League (1)	14	10	4	0	56	16	40	34	1st	Champions	Third round (Note: 2020 FFA Cup edition was cancelled due to the COVID-19 pandemic in Australia)
2021	Gold Coast Premier League (1)	18	13	3	2	80	14	66	42	1st ↑	Semi-Final	Sixth round
2022	Football Queensland Premier League 2 (3)	22	17	4	1	85	33	52	55	1st ↑	Champions	Fourth round
2023	Football Queensland Premier League (2)	22	16	4	2	63	23	40	52	1st ↑	Runner-up	Fourth round
2024	FQPL 3 South Coast (4)	22	14	2	6	54	23	31	41	3rd	Semi-Final	Seventh round
2025	FQPL 3 South Coast (4)	22	12	3	7	56	43	13	39	5th	DNQ	

Key:	Premiers / Champions	Promoted ↑ / Qualified	Relegated ↓

The tiers in the above table is the level according to the Football Queensland South Coast zone system, Sources:

== Managers ==
Name	Nationality	From	To
Kirk Brebner	Australia	1 October 2010	30 September 2012
Keith Garland	England	1 October 2012	30 September 2015
David Benigno	Australia	1 October 2015	1 October 2017
Alex Morrison	Australia	10 October 2017	30 September 2023
David Benigno	Australia	1 October 2023	present

== Honours ==
=== Football Queensland ===
- Football Queensland Premier League (second tier)
  - Premiership
    - Winners (1): 2023
  - Championship
    - Runners Up (1): 2023
  - Champions League
    - Winners (1): 2023
- Football Queensland Premier League 2 (third tier)
  - Premiership
    - Winners (1): 2022
  - Championship
    - Winners (1): 2022

=== Football Queensland South Coast ===
- FQPL 3 − South Coast / Gold Coast Premier League (first tier)
  - Premiership
    - Winners (3): 2002, 2020, 2021
  - Championship
    - Winners (3): 2002, 2016, 2020
    - Runners Up (3): 1980, 1987, 2019
  - President's Cup
    - Winners (1): 2000
    - Runners Up (2): 2002, 2021
  - FA Cup
    - Runners Up (1): 1994
- FQPL 4 − South Coast / Men's Coast League 1 / Division 1 (second tier)
  - Premiership
    - Winners (1): 1997, 2013
  - Championship
    - Winners (1): 2013
    - Runners Up (1): 1997
  - President's Cup
    - Runners Up (1): 1997
