= Burleigh Heads SC =

Burleigh Heads
- Full name: Burleigh Heads Soccer Club
- Nickname: Bulldogs
- Founded: 1981; 45 years ago
- Ground: Pizzey Park
- Chairman: John Bray
- Manager: Colin Phelan
- League: FQPL 3 − South Coast
- 2026: 1st of 12 (premiers)
- Website: http://www.burleighheadssoccerclub.com.au/

Burleigh Heads Soccer Club is a semi-professional soccer club based in Burleigh Heads, Queensland, Australia. The club play in the Football Queensland Premier League 3 − South Coast, the top flight of the Football Queensland South Coast administrative division and the fifth flight of the Australian soccer league system. The club have won 7 premierships, 5 championships and 2 President's Cups within the division.

The club was founded in 1981 from the remnants of the Pacific Colts (at the time the Senior team of Palm Beach Soccer Club), where it competed within the Gold Coast first division and was an inaugural member of the Gold Coast Premier League in 1991. The club's home ground is the Pizzey Park.

== Honours ==
=== Football South Coast ===
- FQPL 3 − South Coast / Gold Coast Premier League
  - Premiership
    - Winners (7): 2001, 2004, 2006, 2007, 2019, 2025, 2026
  - Championship
    - Winners (5): 2003, 2004, 2007, 2008, 2019
  - President's Cup
    - Winners (2): 2001, 2006
