= Pizzey Park =

Open-air sports and recreation precinct in Gold Coast, Queensland, Australia

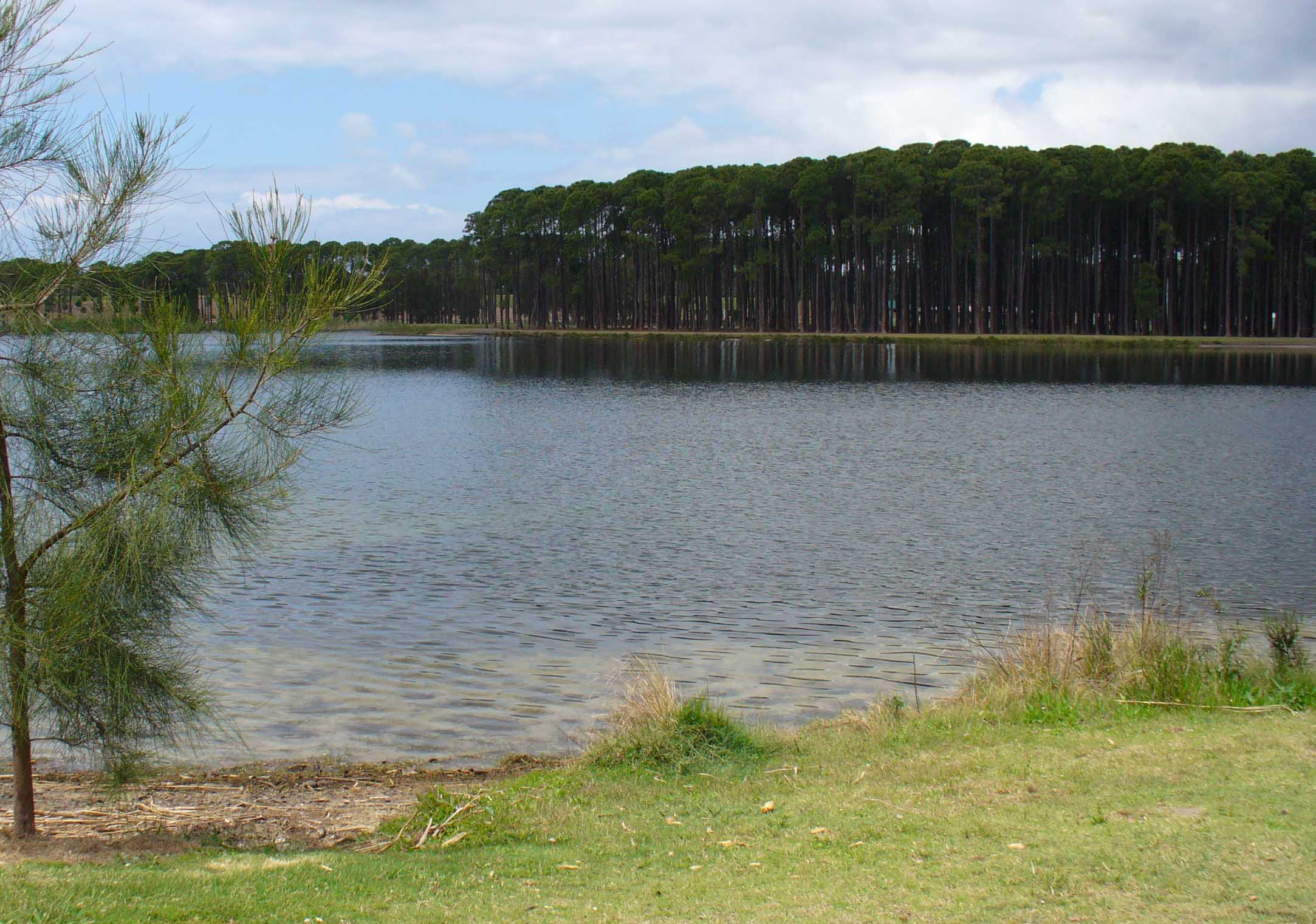
- Pizzey Park lake
- Interactive map of Pizzey Park
- Location: Miami, Gold Coast, Queensland, Australia
- Coordinates: 28.06350°S 153.42634°E
- Owner: Gold Coast City Council
- Surface: Grass

Tenants
- Burleigh Bears (Queensland Cup); Burleigh Heads Bulldogs SC (Gold Coast Soccer); Bond Pirates Rugby Club (GCDRU)

Pizzey Park is an open-air sports and recreation precinct in Miami, a suburb in the Gold Coast, Queensland, Australia. The 60-hectare (150-acre) site is owned and operated by the Gold Coast City Council.

== History ==
The Pizzey Park sporting complex was established on a 60-hectare (150-acre) site in 1969, and was named after the former Queensland Premier Jack Pizzey. The site of Pizzey Park was previously a garbage dump.

The Australian Institute of Sport established their training facilities for canoe/kayak at Pizzey Park in June 1991 at a cost of $500,000. The park was expanded to accommodate this additional facility, extending westward into the neighbouring suburb of Mermaid Waters.

The Gold Coast City Council released the Pizzey Park Masterplan in 2021. This report was developed through consultation with the local community and other stakeholders, and seeks to guide the development of the park over a ten year timeframe with completion expected to occur by the Brisbane 2032 Olympic and Paralympic Games. Ten priority projects have been identified within the masterplan aimed at achieving the stated goal of improving the quality of facilities, encouraging further community use and reducing areas of the park which lack functionality and accessibility.

== Facilities ==
Pizzey Park has sports fields for a wide variety of sports including: rugby league, rugby union, Australian Rules Football, soccer, netball, softball and athletics.

Skateboard and BMX facilities are available. The site also provides a network of tracks for walking, jogging and cycling, around a number of lakes as well as an off-leash dog park.

The site includes the Miami Aquatic Centre featuring two outdoor heated 50-metre (160 ft) swimming pools and one indoor 15-metre (49 ft) teaching pool.

== See also ==
- Sports on the Gold Coast, Queensland
- Sport in Queensland
