= Isle of Capri, Queensland =

Isle of Capri
- Suburb
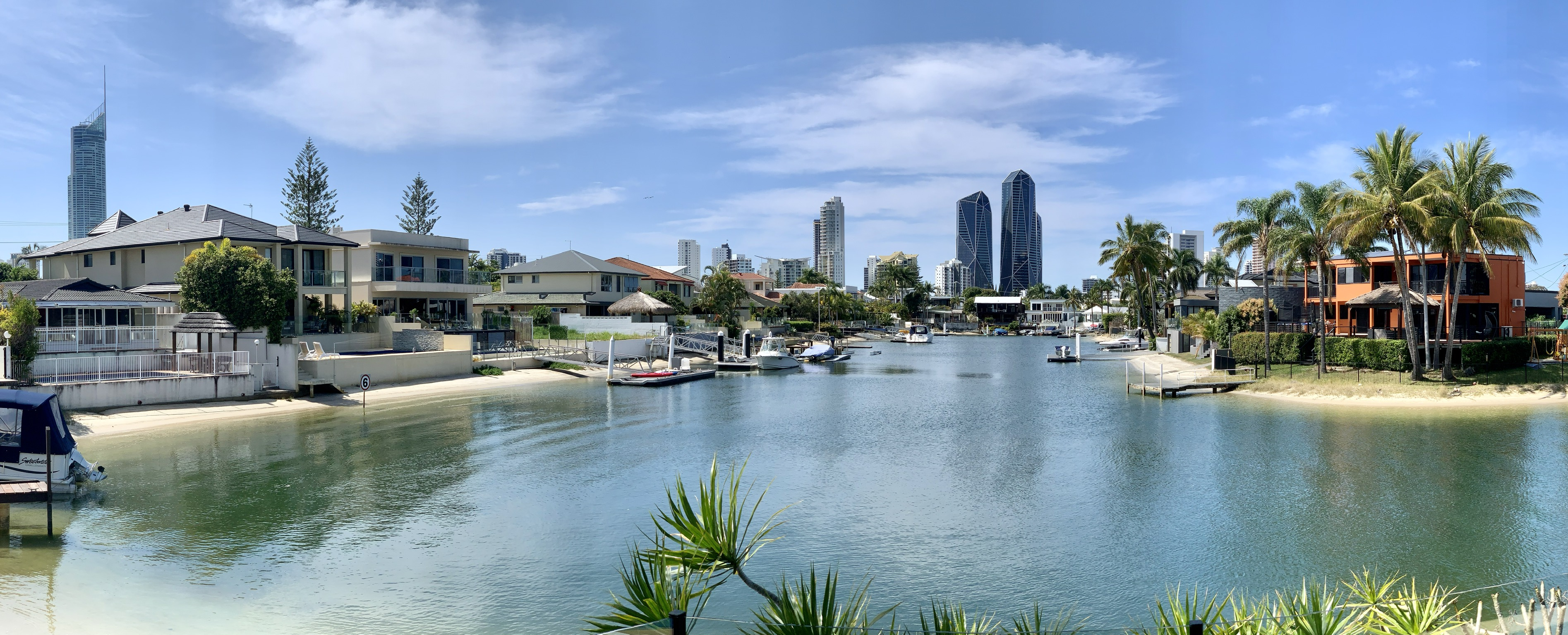
- Isle of Capri, 2020

- Coordinates: 28.0117°S 153.4244°E
- Country: Australia
- State: Queensland
- City: Gold Coast
- LGA: City of Gold Coast
- Location: 2.0 km (1.2 mi) N of Surfers Paradise (centre of suburb); 6.3 km (3.9 mi) SSE of Southport; 78.7 km (48.9 mi) SSE of Brisbane CBD

Government
  - State electorate: Surfers Paradise
  - Federal division: Moncrieff
- Time zone: UTC+10:00 (AEST)
- Postcode: 4217

The Isle of Capri is a neighbourhood within the suburb of Surfers Paradise in the City of Gold Coast, Queensland, Australia.

== History ==
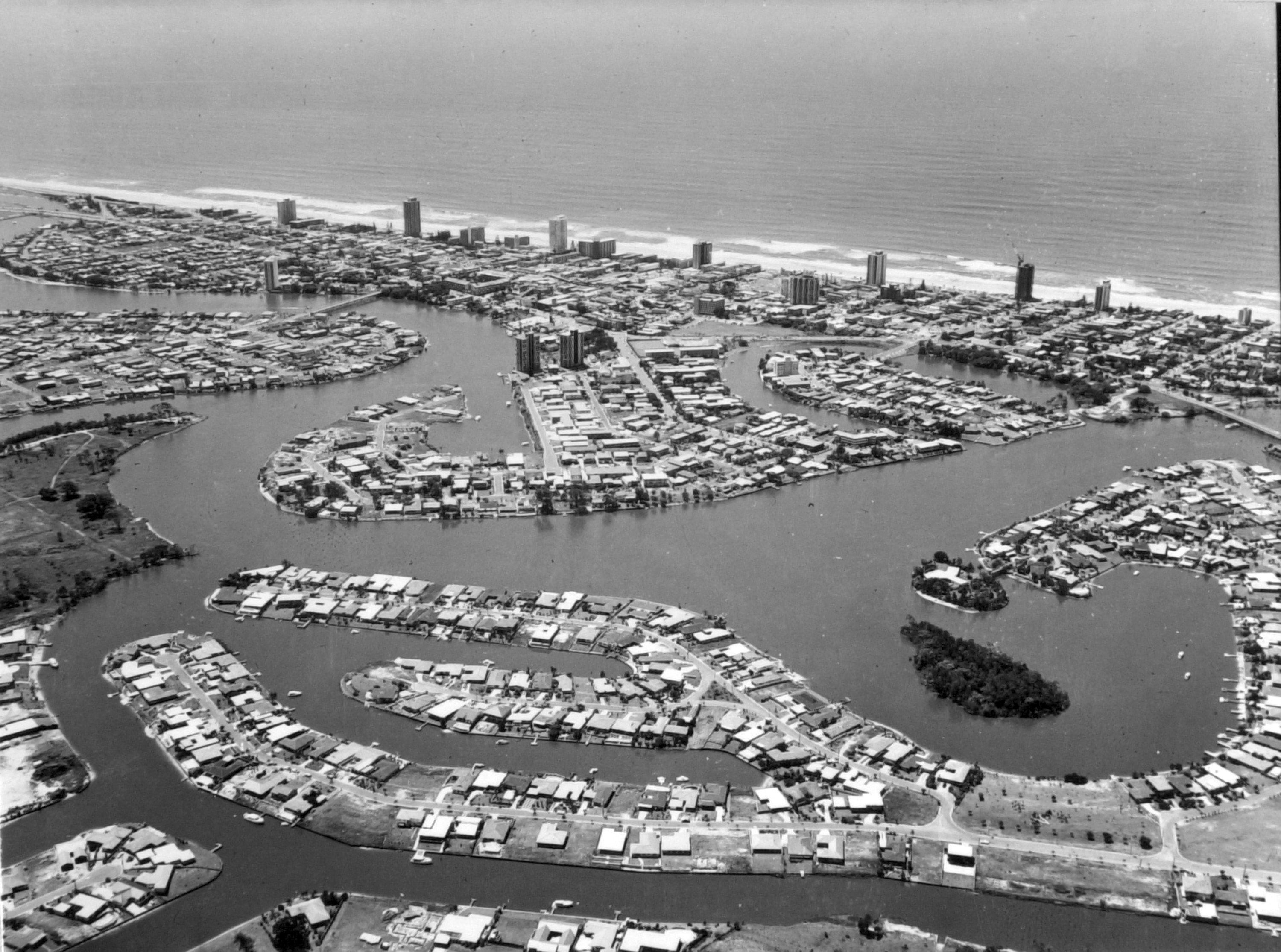
Isle of Capri, 1974

The area served as a sugar harvest for the nearby Benowa Sugar Mill in the late 1800s and early 1900s before becoming a dairy. In the 1950s, local Italian-Australian Efim Zola began a canal development project which involved raising unused farmland and renamed the area Isle of Capri after Capri island in Italy. Future Gold Coast Mayor Bruce Small took over the project in 1958 and completed unfinished developments.

As of the early 2000s, the Isle of Capri is considered an affluent neighbourhood of the Gold Coast.

The original 1960 two lane bridge between the Isle of Capri and Surfers Paradise was replaced by a four lane bridge in 2022.
