= Merrimac F.C. =

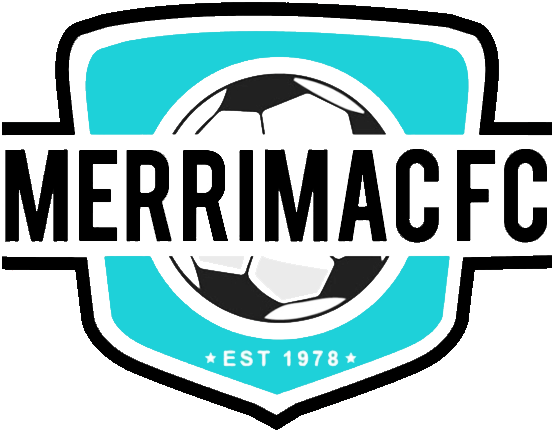
- Full name: Merrimac Football Club
- Nickname: Merrimac
- Founded: 1978; 48 years ago
- Ground: The Gold Coast Italo-Australian Club
- Owner: Chris Cahill
- Website: https://www.merrimacfootballclub.com/
Home colours	Away colours	Third colours

Merrimac Football Club, is a soccer club based in Merrimac, Gold Coast, Queensland, Australia. The club was originally founded in 1978. The club was formally known as Merrimac International Football Club, in reference to its Italian heritage. The club has not fielded a senior men's team since 2017.

Merrimac F.C. is one of three SEQ soccer clubs that are Italian-Australian backed clubs, the others being Brisbane City & AC Carina.

== History ==
Merrimac F.C. is an Australian soccer club from Gold Coast, Queensland Australia. It was an Italian Australian backed club which was founded in 1978. The club's home ground is Fairway Drive in the suburb of Clear Island Waters. The club used to compete in the Gold Coast Premier League.

Fairway Drive
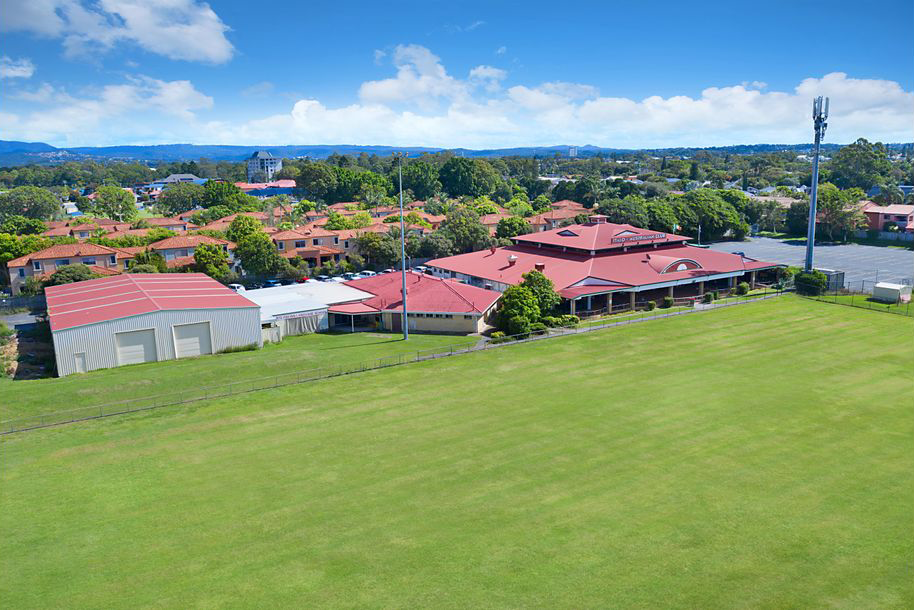
- Merrimac Football Club
- Location: Merrimac, Gold Coast, Queensland, Australia
- Owner: The Gold Coast Italo-Australian Club
- Operator: Merrimac Football Club
- Surface: Seeded grass

Construction
- Opened: January 2020

Tenant
- Merrimac Football Club

== Honours ==
Seasons in bold indicate doubles with both the respective premiership and championship in a single season.

=== Football Gold Coast ===
- **Gold Coast Premier League** (first tier)
  - Premiership
    - Winners (5): **1982**, **1983**, **1986**, 2000, 2012
  - Championship
    - Winners (4): **1982**, **1983**, **1986**, 1999
  - President's Cup
    - Winners (2): 1982, 1983
- **Men's Coast League 1 / Division 1** (second tier)
  - Premiership
    - Winners (1): **2010**
  - Championship
    - Winners (2): 1996, **2010**
  - President's Cup
    - Winners (1): 1996
- **BLK Cup / F.A. Cup** (Gold Coast domestic cup)
  - Winners (4): 1983, 1984, 1985, 1986
