= Australian soccer league system =

Association Football league system of Australia

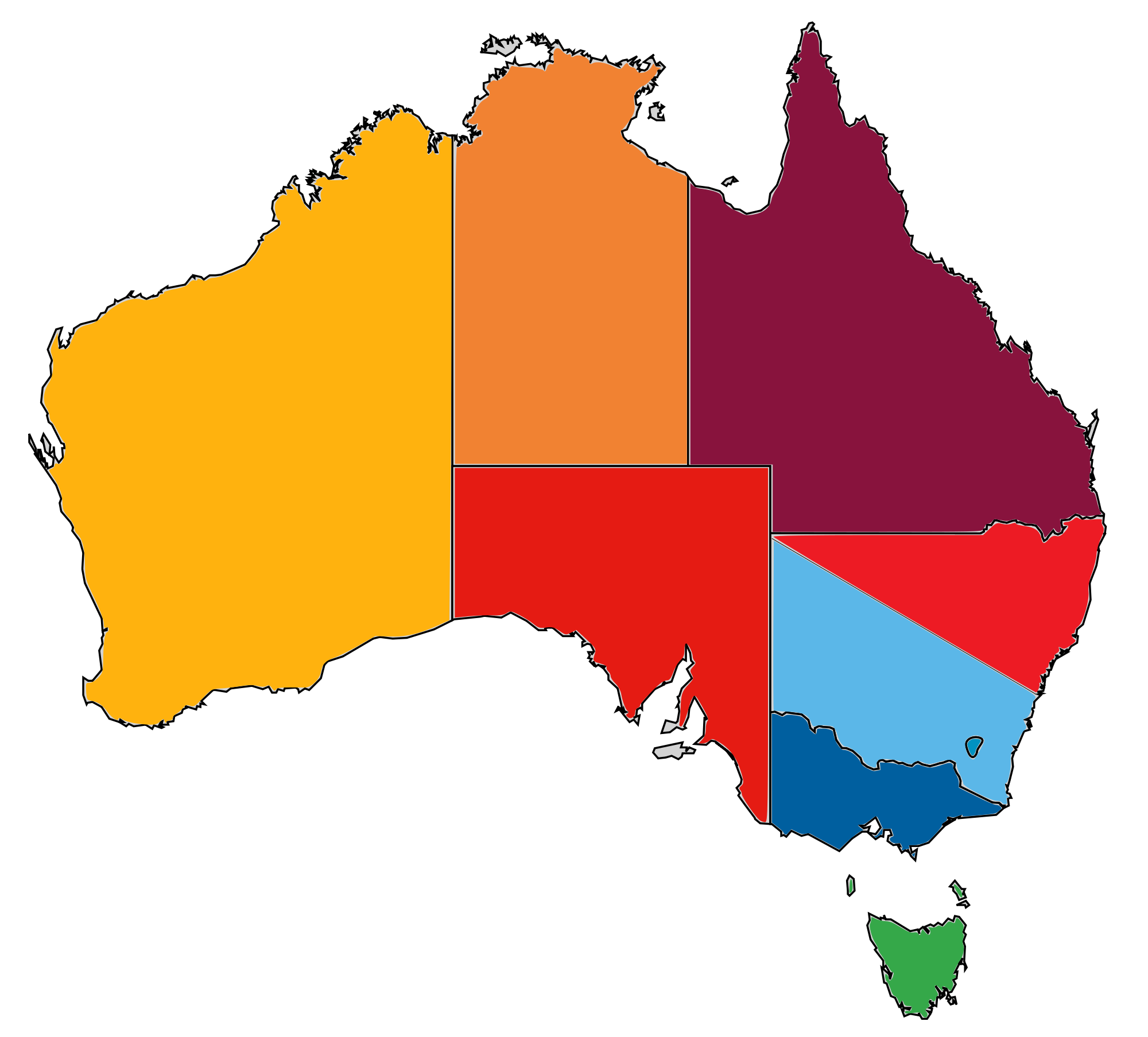
- A map showing the nine member federations of Football Australia, which each control their respective state leagues.
- Country: Australia
- Sport: Association football
- Promotion and relegation: No

National system
- Federation: Football Australia
- Confederation: Asian Football Confederation
- Top division: A-League Men; A-League Women
- Second division: National Premier Leagues Men's; National Premier Leagues Women's
- Cup competition: Australia Cup

Regional systems
- Federations: Capital Football; Football NSW; Northern NSW Football; Football Northern Territory; Football Queensland; Football South Australia; Football Tasmania; Football Victoria; Football West

The Australian soccer league system represents the structure of soccer leagues in Australia. Both the men's and women's structures run on a straight tiered system without promotion and relegation.

The introduction of the National Premier Leagues (NPL) in 2013 introduced a direct second tier of soccer in Australia, underpinning the A-League. The NPL incorporated the existing state leagues as divisions with a nationwide end of season finals series, involving initially five of the nine top state leagues. The remainder – with the exception of the Northern Territory – joined in 2014.

Since 2025, sixteen teams from the NPL contest a post-season spring competition – the Australian Championship. There are aspirations for this competition to eventually become a stand-alone home and away league.

== Men's system ==
Level	Total clubs	League(s) / division(s)	Additional competitions
1	12	A-League Men; 12 clubs (2 from New Zealand)	
2	99	National Premier Leagues Men's; 99 clubs – 8 divisions	Australian Championship; 16 clubs – 4 groups

The system is only defined as far as level 2. What follows is a notional structure, based on which leagues promote and relegate to each other and the connection of Football Australia's associated bodies.

Level	Total clubs	League(s) / division(s)
2	111	National Premier Leagues Capital Football Men's – 11 clubs — 0p, 0r; National Premier Leagues Northern NSW Men's – 12 clubs — 0p, 1.5r; National Premier Leagues NSW Men's – 16 clubs — 0p, 1.5r; National Premier Leagues Queensland Men's – 12 clubs — 0p, 2r; National Premier Leagues South Australia – 12 clubs — 0p, 2r; National Premier Leagues Tasmania – 10 clubs — 0p, 0r; National Premier Leagues Victoria Men's – 14 clubs — 0p, 3r; National Premier Leagues Western Australia Men's – 12 clubs — 0p, 1.5r; NorZone Premier League – 8 clubs — 0r; Southern Zone Premier League – 4 clubs — 0r
3	106	Capital State League Division 1 – 8 clubs — 0p, 0r; Northern League One – 10 clubs — 1.5p, 1r; Football NSW League One – 16 clubs — 1.5p, 1.5r; Football Queensland Premier League 1 – 12 clubs — 2r, 2r; State League 1 South Australia – 12 clubs – 2p, 2r; Northern Championship – 8 clubs – 0p, 0r; Southern Championship – 8 clubs – 0p, 0r; Victorian Premier League 1 – 14 clubs – 3p, 3r; Football West State League Division 1 – 12 clubs – 1.75p, 1.5r
4	99	Capital State League Division 2 – 8 clubs — 0p, 0r; Zone Football League One – 12 clubs — 1p, 1r; Regional Leagues – 7 districts — 0p; Football NSW League Two – 16 clubs — 1.5p, 0r; Football Queensland Premier League 2 – 12 clubs — 2r, 2r; State League 2 South Australia North – 10 clubs – 1p, 0r; State League 2 South Australia South – 10 clubs – 1p, 0r; Northern Social League 1 – 6 clubs – 0p, 0r; Southern Social League 1/2 – 11 clubs – 0p, 0r; Victorian Premier League 2 – 14 clubs – 3p, 2.5r; Football West State League Division 2 – 12 clubs – 1.5p, 1r
5	48	Capital State League Division 3 – 8 clubs — 0p, 0r; Zone Football League Two – 10 clubs — 1p, 1r; Regional Leagues – 19 districts — 0p; Regional Leagues – 9 districts — 2p; Regional Leagues – 6 districts – 0p; Northern Social League 2 – 6 clubs – 0p, 0r; Southern Social League 3 – 10 clubs – 0p, 0r; Victorian State League 1 North-West – 12 clubs – 1.5p, 2r; Victorian State League 1 South-East – 12 clubs – 1.5p, 2r; Regional Leagues – 12 districts – 1p
6	42	Capital State League Division 4 – 8 clubs — 0p, 0r; Zone Football League Three – 10 clubs — 1p, 0r; Southern Social League 4 – 10 clubs – 0p, 0r; Victorian State League 2 North-West – 12 clubs – 2p, 4r; Victorian State League 2 South-East – 12 clubs – 2p, 4r
7	32	Capital State League Division 5 – 8 clubs — 0p, 0r; Victorian State League 3 North-West – 12 clubs – 4p, 4r; Victorian State League 3 South-East – 12 clubs – 4p, 4r
8	33	Capital State League Division 6 – 9 clubs — 0p, 0r; Victorian State League 4 North-West – 12 clubs – 4p, 4r; Victorian State League 4 South-East – 12 clubs – 4p, 4r
9	36	Capital State League Division 7 – 12 clubs — 0p, 0r; Victorian State League 5 North-West – 12 clubs – 4p, 4r; Victorian State League 5 South-East – 12 clubs – 4p, 4r
10	36	Capital State League Division 8 – 12 clubs — 0p, 0r; Victorian State League 6 North-West – 12 clubs – 4p, 4r; Victorian State League 6 South-East – 12 clubs – 4p, 4r
11	33	Capital State League Division 9 – 9 clubs — 0p, 0r; Victorian State League 7 North-West – 12 clubs – 4p, 4r; Victorian State League 7 South-East – 12 clubs – 4p, 4r
12	20	Capital State League Division 10 Blue – 10 clubs — 0p, 0r; Capital State League Division 10 Gold – 10 clubs — 0p, 0r; Victorian Metropolitan Leagues – 9 divisions – 0p; Victorian Regional Leagues – 15 districts – 0p

Key

- p = promotion
- r = relegation

== Women's system ==
The women's soccer league system in Australia is similar to that of the men's.

Level	Total clubs	League(s) / division(s)
1	11	A-League Women; 11 clubs (1 from New Zealand)
2	91	National Premier Leagues Women's; 91 clubs – 8 divisions

The system is only defined as far as level 2. What follows is a notional structure, based on which leagues promote and relegate to each other and the connection of Football Australia's associated bodies.

Level	Total clubs	League(s) / division(s)
2	96	NPL Women's Capital Football – 8 clubs — 0p, 0r; NPL Women's Northern NSW – 7 clubs — 0p, 1r; NPL Women's NSW – 14 clubs — 0p, 1.5r; NPL Women's Queensland – 16 clubs — 0p, 2r; NPL Women's South Australia – 12 clubs — 0p, 2r; NPL Women's Tasmania – 8 clubs — 0p, 0r; NPL Women's Victoria – 14 clubs — 0p, 2r; NPL Women's Western Australia – 12 clubs — 0p, 1.5r; NorZone Women's Premier League – 5 clubs — 0r
3	52	Capital League Women's Division 1 – 6 clubs — 0p, 0r; NSW League One Women's – 14 clubs — 1.5p, 0r; Football Queensland Premier League 1 – 12 clubs — 2r, 2.5r; Women's State League South Australia – 12 clubs — 2p, 0r; Victorian Premier League Women – 8 clubs — 2p, 4r
4	41	Capital League Women's Division 2 – 9 clubs — 0p, 0r; Football Queensland Premier League 2 – 12 clubs — 2.5r, 2r; Victorian State League Women 1 North-West – 10 clubs — 2p, 2r; Victorian State League Women 1 South-West – 10 clubs — 2p, 2r
5	14	Capital League Women's Division 3 – 14 clubs — 0p, 0r
6	10	Capital League Women's Division 4 – 10 clubs — 0p, 0r
7	12	Capital League Women's Division 5 – 12 clubs — 0p, 0r
8	11	Capital League Women's Division 6 – 11 clubs — 0p, 0r

Key

- p = promotion
- r = relegation

== See also ==
- Soccer in Australia
- Capital Football pyramid
- Football Queensland pyramid
- Football South Australia pyramid
- League system, for a list of similar systems in other countries
- Australian Championship
- List of association football competitions
