= 2014 in Queensland soccer =

Football Queensland
- Season: 2014
- Champions: Palm Beach

The 2014 Football Queensland season was the second season since NPL Queensland commenced as the top tier of Queensland men's football. Below NPL Queensland is a regional structure of ten zones with their own leagues. The strongest of the zones is Football Brisbane with its senior men's competition consisting of five divisions.

The NPL Queensland premiers qualified for the National Premier Leagues finals series, competing with the other state federation champions in a final knockout tournament to decide the National Premier Leagues Champion for 2014.

== Men's League Tables ==
=== 2014 National Premier League Queensland ===
NPL Queensland
- Season: 2014
- Champions: Palm Beach
- Premiers: Palm Beach
- Matches: 156
- Goals: 660 (4.23 per match)
- Top goalscorer: Royce Brownlie (34 goals)
- Biggest home win: Moreton Bay United 9–0 SWQ Thunder (17 June 2014)
- Biggest away win: SWQ Thunder 0–8 Brisbane Strikers (13 March 2014); Palm Beach 1–9 Olympic FC (3 September 2014)
- Highest scoring: Moreton Bay United 9–2 Far North Queensland Heat (22 March 2014)

The National Premier League Queensland 2014 season was played over 24 matches, from March to September 2014.

Pos	Team	Pld	W	D	L	GF	GA	GD	Pts	Qualification or relegation
1	Palm Beach (C)	24	17	4	3	73	29	+44	55	2014 National Premier Leagues Finals
2	Far North Queensland	24	15	3	6	64	48	+16	48	2014 Queensland Finals
3	Olympic FC	24	14	5	5	72	37	+35	47	2014 Queensland Finals
4	Brisbane Strikers	24	14	3	7	53	38	+15	45	2014 Queensland Finals
5	Moreton Bay United	24	12	4	8	78	53	+25	40	
6	Redlands United	24	11	5	8	54	48	+6	38 (Note: The Round 25 fixture between South West Thunder and Redlands United was cancelled and declared a 0–0 draw.)	
7	Brisbane City	24	11	4	9	42	37	+5	37	
8	Sunshine Coast	24	11	1	12	39	39	0	34	
9	Harimau Muda	24	9	6	9	51	45	+6	33	Team withdrew at end of season
10	Brisbane Roar Youth	24	9	4	11	45	51	−6	31	
11	Northern Fury	24	6	4	14	38	50	−12	22	
12	Western Pride	24	5	0	19	39	73	−34	15	
13	South West Queensland Thunder	24	0	1	23	12	112	−100	1	
14	Central Queensland Energy	0	0	0	0	0	0	0	0	Team removed pre-season

Source: foxsportspulse.com
Rules for classification: 1) points; 2) goal difference; 3) number of goals scored.
Note: Central Queensland Energy were removed from the NPL in March 2014 after failing to meet licensing conditions.
(C) Champions

==== Finals ====
Semi-finals
1	Palm Beach	2
4	Brisbane Strikers	1
2	FNQ FC Heat	4
3	Olympic	5

Grand Final
1	Palm Beach	3
3	Olympic	2

=== 2014 Brisbane Premier League ===
Brisbane Premier League
- Season: 2014
- Champions: Peninsula Power
- Premiers: Wolves FC
- Relegated: North Star, Brisbane Force
- Matches: 132
- Goals: 491 (3.72 per match)
- Top goalscorer: Kado Aoci (17 goals)
- Biggest home win: Albany Creek 8–2 North Star (23 August 2014)
- Biggest away win: North Star 0–6 Eastern Suburbs (5 April 2014)
- Highest scoring: Albany Creek 8–2 North Star (23 August 2014)

The 2014 Brisbane Premier League was the 32nd edition of the Brisbane Premier League which has been a second level domestic association football competition in Queensland since the Queensland State League was formed in 2008. 12 teams competed, all playing each other twice for a total of 22 rounds.

Pos	Team	Pld	W	D	L	GF	GA	GD	Pts	Qualification or relegation
1	Wolves FC	22	21	0	1	71	17	+54	63	2014 Brisbane Premier League Finals
2	Peninsula Power (C)	22	16	3	3	49	20	+29	51	2014 Brisbane Premier League Finals
3	Lions FC	22	16	2	4	63	18	+45	50	2014 Brisbane Premier League Finals
4	Eastern Suburbs	22	13	4	5	41	19	+22	43 (Note: The Round 22 fixture between Eastern Suburbs and Logan Lightning was cancelled and declared a 0–0 draw.)	2014 Brisbane Premier League Finals
5	Logan Lightning	22	10	3	9	36	38	−2	33	
6	Capalaba	22	9	2	11	44	51	−7	29	
7	Ipswich Knights	22	9	2	11	42	49	−7	29	
8	Albany Creek	22	7	1	14	35	56	−21	22	
9	Rochedale Rovers	22	5	3	14	30	56	−26	18	
10	North Star (R)	22	4	4	14	31	70	−39	16	Relegated to 2015 Capital League 1 (Note: Promotion and Relegation system based on Club Championship and including points from First Grade, Reserve Grade, U18 and U16 teams.)
11	Brisbane Force (R)	22	4	3	15	24	54	−30	15	Relegated to 2015 Capital League 1
12	UQ FC	22	4	1	17	25	43	−18	13	

Source: sportstg.com
Rules for classification: 1) points; 2) goal difference; 3) number of goals scored.
(C) Champions; (R) Relegated

==== Finals ====
Semi-finals
1	Wolves FC	5
2	Peninsula Power	1
3	Lions FC	2 (4)
4	Eastern Suburbs	2 (3)

Preliminary Final
2	Peninsula Power	1 (4)
3	Lions FC	1 (1)

Grand Final
1	Wolves FC	0
2	Peninsula Power	5

=== 2014 Capital League 1 ===
Capital League 1
- Season: 2014
- Champions: Taringa Rovers
- Premiers: Mitchelton
- Promoted: Taringa Rovers
- Relegated: Pine Hills, Souths United
- Matches: 132
- Goals: 453 (3.43 per match)
- Top goalscorer: Craig Parker (14 goals)
- Biggest home win: Pine Rivers United 6–0 Pine Hills (11 April 2014)
- Biggest away win: Annerley 0–6 Mitchelton (10 May 2014)
- Highest scoring: Pine Hills 8–3 Bayside United (5 April 2014)

The 2014 Capital League 1 season was the second edition of the Capital League 1 as the third level domestic football competition in Queensland. 12 teams competed, all playing each other twice for a total of 22 matches.

Pos	Team	Pld	W	D	L	GF	GA	GD	Pts	Qualification or relegation
1	Mitchelton (P)	22	18	2	2	58	16	+42	56	Promoted to the 2015 Brisbane Premier League
2	Taringa Rovers (C, P)	22	14	3	5	43	24	+19	45	Promoted to the 2015 Brisbane Premier League
3	Bayside United	22	13	4	5	56	30	+26	43	2014 Capital League 1 Finals
4	Moggill FC	22	11	5	6	45	37	+8	38	2014 Capital League 1 Finals
5	Pine Rivers United	22	9	8	5	51	42	+9	35	
6	North Pine	22	7	5	10	40	40	0	26	
7	Southside Eagles	22	6	6	10	28	41	−13	24	
8	Mount Gravatt	22	6	5	11	22	33	−11	23	
9	Grange Thistle	22	6	5	11	27	49	−22	23	
10	Annerley	22	5	6	11	28	40	−12	21	
11	Pine Hills (R)	22	4	7	11	39	52	−13	19	Relegated to 2015 Capital League 2
12	Souths United (R)	22	3	4	15	16	49	−33	13	Relegated to 2015 Capital League 2

Note: Three games (one in Round 21, two in Round 22) were cancelled and declared a 0–0 draw.
(C) Champions; (P) Promoted; (R) Relegated

==== Finals ====
Semi-finals
1	Mitchelton	0
2	Taringa Rovers	2
3	Bayside United	2
4	Moggill	0

Preliminary Final
1	Mitchelton	1
3	Bayside United	2

Grand Final
2	Taringa Rovers	1 (4)
3	Bayside United	1 (1)

=== 2014 Capital League 2 ===
Capital League 2
- Season: 2014
- Champions: Holland Park Hawks
- Premiers: Holland Park Hawks
- Promoted: Brisbane Knights
- Relegated: Kangaroo Point Rovers, Samford Rangers
- Matches: 132
- Goals: 587 (4.45 per match)
- Top goalscorer: Luke Proctor (39 goals)
- Biggest home win: Redcliffe PCYC 9–0 Slacks Creek (19 July 2014)
- Biggest away win: Samford Rangers 1–9 Holland Park Hawks (16 May 2014)
- Highest scoring: 10 goals (4 times)

The 2014 Capital League 2 season was the second edition of the Capital League 2 as the fourth level domestic football competition in Queensland. 12 teams competed, all playing each other twice for a total of 22 matches.

Pos	Team	Pld	W	D	L	GF	GA	GD	Pts	Qualification or relegation
1	Holland Park Hawks (C, P)	22	17	1	4	91	21	+70	52 (Note: The Round 22 fixture between Holland Park Hawks and Samford Rangers was cancelled and declared a 0–0 draw.)	Promoted to 2014 Capital League 1
2	Brisbane Knights (P)	22	14	3	5	55	33	+22	45	Promoted to 2014 Capital League 1
3	Newmarket	22	14	2	6	67	36	+31	44	2014 Capital League 2 Finals
4	Park Ridge	22	14	1	7	45	35	+10	43	2014 Capital League 2 Finals
5	Ipswich City	22	13	2	7	69	48	+21	41	
6	The Gap	22	13	1	8	45	38	+7	40	
7	Redcliffe PCYC	22	13	0	9	71	40	+31	39	
8	Western Spirit	22	11	3	8	41	29	+12	36	
9	Oxley United	22	5	2	15	36	60	−24	17	
10	Kangaroo Point Rovers (R)	22	4	2	16	26	68	−42	14	Relegated to 2015 Capital League 3
11	Slacks Creek	22	4	1	17	23	65	−42	13	
12	Samford Rangers (R)	22	0	2	20	18	108	−90	2	Relegated to 2015 Capital League 3

(C) Champions; (P) Promoted; (R) Relegated

==== Finals ====
Semi-finals
1	Holland Park Hawks	2
2	Brisbane Knights	1
3	Newmarket	2
4	Park Ridge	4

Preliminary Final
2	Brisbane Knights	0
4	Park Ridge	1

Grand Final
1	Holland Park Hawks	3
2	Park Ridge	2

=== 2014 Capital League 3 ===
Capital League 3
- Season: 2014
- Champions: Centenary Stormers
- Premiers: Centenary Stormers
- Promoted: Westside
- Relegated: Brighton Bulldogs, Logan City Kings
- Matches: 132
- Goals: 575 (4.36 per match)
- Top goalscorer: Clinton La Carta (25 goals)
- Biggest home win: Toowong 10–1 Brighton Bulldogs (16 August 2014)
- Biggest away win: Brighton Bulldogs 0–12 Centenary Stormers (12 April 2014)
- Highest scoring: Centenary Stormers 8–4 Narangba United (15 March 2014); Brighton Bulldogs 0–12 Centenary Stormers (12 April 2014)

The 2014 Capital League 3 season was the second edition of the Capital League 3 as the fifth level domestic football competition in Queensland. 12 teams competed, all playing each other twice for a total of 22 matches.

Pos	Team	Pld	W	D	L	GF	GA	GD	Pts	Qualification or relegation
1	Centenary Stormers (C, P)	22	17	3	2	86	31	+55	54	Promoted to 2015 Capital League 2
2	Westside (P)	22	16	2	4	53	21	+32	50	Promoted to 2015 Capital League 2
3	Toowong	22	13	2	7	62	31	+31	41	2014 Capital League 3 Finals
4	New Farm United	22	13	1	8	46	36	+10	40	2014 Capital League 3 Finals
5	Narangba United	22	12	3	7	59	38	+21	39	
6	Virginia United	22	9	3	10	46	39	+7	30	
7	AC Carina	22	8	4	10	46	56	−10	28	
8	Clairvaux	22	8	2	12	47	69	−22	26	
9	Ridge Hills United	22	6	7	9	42	47	−5	25	
10	Jimboomba United	22	6	4	12	32	45	−13	22	
11	Brighton Bulldogs (R)	22	5	3	14	33	78	−45	18	Relegated to 2015 Capital League 4
12	Logan City Kings (R)	22	0	4	18	23	84	−61	4	Relegated to 2015 Capital League 4

Note: Three games (one in Round 21, two in Round 22) were cancelled and declared a 0–0 draw.
(C) Champions; (P) Promoted; (R) Relegated

==== Finals ====
Semi-finals
1	Centenary Stormers	2
2	Westside	3
3	Toowong	1
4	New Farm United	2

Preliminary Final
2	Westside	1 (1)
4	New Farm United	1 (4)

Grand Final
1	Centenary Stormers	0 (4)
2	New Farm United	0 (2)

=== 2014 Capital League 4 ===
Capital League 4
- Season: 2014
- Champions: Acacia Ridge
- Premiers: Acacia Ridge
- Promoted: Tarragindi Tigers
- Matches: 84
- Goals: 423 (5.04 per match)
- Top goalscorer: Juan Jaimes (28 goals)
- Biggest home win: Acacia Ridge 10–0 (twice) vs Peninsula Power (17 May 2014) vs The Lakes (13 June 2014)
- Biggest away win: The Lakes 0–17 Acacia Ridge (16 August 2014)
- Highest scoring: The Lakes 0–17 Acacia Ridge (16 August 2014)

The 2014 Capital League 4 season was the second edition of the Capital League 4 as the sixth level domestic football competition in Queensland. 8 teams competed, all playing each other three times for a total of 21 matches.

Pos	Team	Pld	W	D	L	GF	GA	GD	Pts	Qualification or relegation
1	Acacia Ridge (C, P)	21	17	2	2	106	20	+86	53	Promoted to 2015 Capital League 3
2	Tarragindi Tigers (P)	21	15	2	4	82	26	+56	47	Promoted to 2015 Capital League 3
3	Bethania Rams	21	13	4	4	65	31	+34	43	Capital League 4 Finals, and team withdrew at end of season
4	Logan Village	21	11	2	8	48	43	+5	35	2014 Capital League 4 Finals
5	The Lakes	21	8	2	11	37	66	−29	26	Team withdrew at end of season
6	Bardon Latrobe	21	6	2	13	26	62	−36	20	
7	Greenbank	21	3	3	15	31	84	−53	12	
8	Mooroondu	21	2	1	18	28	91	−63	7	

Note: Three Round 21 games were cancelled and declared a 0–0 draw.
(C) Champions; (P) Promoted

==== Finals ====
Semi-finals
1	Acacia Ridge	3
2	Tarragindi Tigers	0
3	Bethania Rams	2
4	Logan Village	0

Preliminary Final
2	Tarragindi Tigers	3 (4)
3	Bethania Rams	3 (2)

Grand Final
1	Acacia Ridge	3
2	Tarragindi Tigers	0

== Women's League Tables ==
=== 2014 Women's SEQ Premier League ===
Women's SEQ Premier League
- Season: 2014
- Champions: The Gap
- Premiers: The Gap
- Matches: 133
- Goals: 603 (4.53 per match)
- Top goalscorer: Brittany Whitfield (40 goals)
- Biggest home win: The Gap 12–0 Souths United (17 May 2014)
- Biggest away win: Western Pride 1–12 Palm Beach (11 May 2014)
- Highest scoring: Western Pride 1–12 Palm Beach (11 May 2014)

The 2014 Women's South-East Queensland Premier League season was the top level domestic football of women's competition in Queensland. 14 teams competed, all playing each other once in Stage One. The teams then competed in Stage Two, with the top seven teams progressed to Section One, while the bottom seven teams played in Section Two. All teams carried forward results from Stage One, then played the other teams in their section once. Each Stage Two section had its own finals series which featured the top four teams playing off. The winner of the Section One Grand Final was crowned the champion team.

Pos	Team	Pld	W	D	L	GF	GA	GD	Pts	Qualification or relegation (Note: Teams were split into two groups (Section 1 and Section 2) after each have played 13 matches.)
1	The Gap (C)	19	16	0	3	82	20	+62	48	Finals (Section 1)
2	Palm Beach	19	13	2	4	80	18	+62	41	Finals (Section 1)
3	UQ FC	19	13	0	6	45	20	+25	39	Finals (Section 1)
4	Redlands United	19	12	1	6	58	34	+24	37	Finals (Section 1)
5	Eastern Suburbs	19	11	1	7	54	31	+23	34	
6	Olympic FC	19	11	1	7	37	18	+19	34	
7	Sunshine Coast	19	9	2	8	34	46	−12	29	
8	Annerley	19	9	2	8	32	41	−9	29	Finals (Section 2)
9	Peninisula Power	19	9	0	10	56	54	+2	27	Finals (Section 2)
10	South West Queensland Thunder	19	7	4	8	28	40	−12	25	Finals (Section 2)
11	Mitchelton	19	8	0	11	36	58	−22	24	Finals (Section 2)
12	Souths United	19	4	2	13	27	52	−25	14	
13	Taringa Rovers	19	3	1	15	16	63	−47	10	
14	Western Pride	19	0	0	19	18	108	−90	0	

Source: sportstg.com
(C) Champions

==== Finals (Section 1) ====
Semi-finals
1	The Gap	5
2	Palm Beach	1
3	UQ FC	0 (2)
4	Redlands United	0 (4)

Preliminary Final
2	Palm Beach	1
3	Redlands United	2

Grand Final
1	The Gap	4
4	Redlands United	0

==== Finals (Section 2) ====
Semi-finals
8	Annerley	3
9	Peninisula Power	2
10	SW Qld Thunder	2 (2)
11	Mitchelton	2 (4)

Preliminary Final
9	Peninisula Power	2
11	Mitchelton	1

Grand Final
8	Annerley	2
9	Peninisula Power	1

== Cup Competitions ==
=== 2014 Canale Travel Cup ===
Brisbane-based soccer clubs competed in 2014 for the Canale Cup. Clubs entered from the Brisbane Premier League, the Capital League 1, Capital League 2 and Capital League 3.

This knockout competition was won by Brisbane Strikers.

The competition was also part of the FQ Cup competition, where the final of the Canale Cup served as the semi-final for the FQ Cup. The competition was also a qualifying competition for the 2014 FFA Cup. In addition to the Brisbane Strikers, Olympic FC qualified for the final rounds, entering at the Round of 32.

=== FQ Cup ===
The competition also served as the Queensland Preliminary rounds for the 2014 FFA Cup. The four semi-finalists qualified for the final rounds of the FFA Cup; Far North Queensland FC (representing North Queensland), Palm Beach (representing South East Queensland), with Brisbane Strikers and Olympic FC representing Brisbane. The four semi-finalists, along with A-League club Brisbane Roar qualified for the final rounds, entering at the Round of 32.
