= 2017 FFA Cup preliminary rounds =

Qualification rounds for 2017 season of Australian soccer competition

Tournament details
- Country: Australia
- Teams: 735

The 2017 FFA Cup preliminary rounds was the qualifying competition to decide 21 of the 32 teams which took part in the 2017 FFA Cup Round of 32, along with the 10 A-League clubs and reigning National Premier Leagues champion (Sydney United 58). The preliminary rounds operated within a consistent national structure whereby club entry into the competition is staggered in each federation, with the winning clubs from Round 7 of the preliminary rounds in each member federation gaining entry into the Round of 32. All Australian clubs were eligible to enter the qualifying process through their respective FFA member federation, however only one team per club was permitted entry in the competition.

== Schedule ==
The number of fixtures for each round, and the match dates for each Federation, are as follows.

| Round | Number of fixtures | Clubs | ACT | NSW | NNSW | NT | QLD | SA | TAS | VIC | WA |
|---|---|---|---|---|---|---|---|---|---|---|---|
| First qualifying round | 9 | 735 → 726 | – | – | – | – | – | – | – | 10–12 Feb | – |
| Second qualifying round | 28 | 726 → 698 | – | – | – | – | – | – | – | 17–18 Feb | – |
| First round | 50 + 7 byes | 698 → 648 | – | – | 25–26 Feb | – | 8 Mar | – | – | 25–28 Feb | – |
| Second round | 128 + 6 byes | 648 → 520 | – | 11–12 Mar | 17 Feb–8 Apr | – | 9 Feb–5 Apr | 11–13 Mar | – | 3–6 Mar | 19 Mar |
| Third round | 191 + 11 byes | 520 → 329 | 11–20 Apr | 15 Mar–4 Apr | 11 Mar–27 Apr | 4–26 Apr | 4 Mar–12 Apr | 24–26 Mar | 13 Mar | 11–13 Mar | 1–2 Apr |
| Fourth round | 151 | 329 → 178 | 9–20 May | 29 Mar–2 May | 2–13 May | 2–16 May | 18 Mar–19 Apr | 13–17 Apr | 17 Apr | 17–19 Mar | 17 Apr |
| Fifth round | 83 + 1 bye | 178 → 95 | 30 May–3 Jun | 19 Apr–10 May | 17–20 May | 26 Apr–30 May | 8 Apr–10 May | 13–15 May | 29 Apr | 28 Mar–13 Apr | 25 Apr |
| Sixth round | 42 | 95 → 53 | 8 June | 9–24 May | 10 Jun | 10 May–13 Jun | 30 Apr–30 May | 13–14 Jun | 20–21 May | 25 Apr–4 May | 20–21 May |
| Seventh round | 21 | 53 → 32 | 17 Jun | 30–31 May | 12–13 Jun | 24 Jun | 9–10 Jun | 24 Jun | 12 Jun | 23–24 May | 5 Jun |

- Some round dates in respective Federations overlap due to separate scheduling of zones.

== Format ==
The preliminary rounds structures were as follows, and refer to the different levels in the unofficial Australian soccer league system :

- First qualifying round:

- 18 Victorian clubs level 9 and below entered this stage.

- Second qualifying round:

- 56 Victorian clubs (9 from the previous round and 47 level 8) entered this stage.

- First round:

- 10 Northern NSW clubs level 4 and below entered this stage.
- 88 Victorian clubs (28 from the previous round and 60 level 6–7) entered this stage.

- Second round:

- 18 New South Wales clubs level 6 and below entered this stage.
- 52 Northern NSW clubs (5 from the previous round and 52 level 4 and below) entered this stage.
- Queensland: 38 Brisbane-based clubs level 4 and below entered this stage.
- 20 South Australian clubs level 3–5 entered this stage.
- 80 Victorian clubs (44 from the previous round and 36 level 5–6) entered this stage.
- 10 Western Australian clubs level 6 and below entered this stage.

- Third round:

- 11 Australian Capital Territory clubs level 3 and below entered this stage.
- 116 New South Wales clubs (9 from the previous round and 107 level 4 and below) entered this stage.
- 41 Northern NSW clubs (30 from the previous round and 11 level 3) entered this stage.
- 6 Northern Territory clubs level 2 and below entered this stage.
- Queensland: 39 Brisbane-based clubs (19 from the previous round and 20 level 3–4) entered this stage.
- 32 South Australian clubs (10 from the previous round and 22 level 2–3) entered this stage.
- 8 Tasmanian clubs level 3 entered this stage.
- 64 Victorian clubs (40 from the previous round and 24 level 4) entered this stage.
- 32 Western Australian clubs (10 from the previous round and 28 level 3–5) entered this stage.

- Fourth round:

- 16 Australian Capital Territory clubs (7 from the previous round and 9 level 2) entered this stage.
- 80 New South Wales clubs (58 from the previous round and 22 level 2–3) entered this stage.
- 31 Northern NSW clubs (21 from the previous round and 10 level 2) entered this stage.
- 6 Northern Territory clubs (3 from the previous round and 3 level 2 and below) entered this stage.
- 42 Queensland clubs progressed to this stage.
- 16 South Australian clubs progressed to this stage.
- 16 Tasmanian clubs (4 from the previous round and 12 level 2–3) entered this stage.
- 64 Victorian clubs (32 from the previous round and 32 level 2–3) entered this stage.
- 32 Western Australian clubs (19 from the previous round and 13 level 2) entered this stage.

- Fifth round:

- 8 Australian Capital Territory clubs progressed to this stage.
- 40 New South Wales clubs progressed to this stage.
- 16 Northern New South Wales clubs progressed to this stage.
- 7 Northern Territory clubs (3 from the previous round and 4 level 2–3) entered this stage.
- 32 Queensland clubs (22 from the previous round and 10 level 2) entered this stage.
- 8 South Australian clubs progressed to this stage.
- 8 Tasmanian clubs progressed to this stage.
- 32 Victorian clubs progressed to this stage.
- 16 Western Australian clubs progressed to this stage.

- Sixth round:

- 4 Australian Capital Territory clubs progressed to this stage.
- 20 New South Wales clubs progressed to this stage.
- 8 Northern New South Wales clubs progressed to this stage.
- 4 Northern Territory clubs progressed to this stage.
- 16 Queensland clubs progressed to this stage.
- 4 South Australian clubs progressed to this stage.
- 4 Tasmanian clubs progressed to this stage.
- 16 Victorian clubs progressed to this stage.
- 8 Western Australian clubs progressed to this stage.

- Seventh round:

- 2 Australian Capital Territory clubs progressed to this stage, which was also the Final of the Federation Cup.
- 10 New South Wales clubs progressed to this stage. The 5 winners – along with the reigning National Premier Leagues champion Sydney United 58 – also participated in the Waratah Cup.
- 4 Northern New South Wales clubs progressed to this stage.
- 2 Northern Territory clubs progressed to this stage – the winners of the Darwin-based and Alice Springs-based knockout competitions – which doubled as the final of the Sport Minister's Cup.
- 8 Queensland clubs progressed to this stage.
- 2 South Australian clubs progressed to this stage, which was also the Grand Final of the Federation Cup.
- 2 Tasmanian clubs progressed to this stage, which was also the Grand Final of the Milan Lakoseljac Cup.
- 8 Victorian clubs progressed to this stage. The 4 winners also qualified to the semi-finals of the Dockerty Cup.
- 4 Western Australian clubs progressed to this stage. The 2 winners also progressed to the Final of the Football West State Cup.

=== Other qualification issues ===
- A-League Youth teams playing in their respective federation leagues were specifically excluded from the preliminary rounds as their respective Senior A-League clubs are already part of the competition.
- Sydney United 58 did not participate in the New South Wales qualifying rounds, as they had already qualified for the FFA Cup as 2016 National Premier Leagues champions.

== Key to abbreviations ==
| Federation | Zone |
|---|---|
| ACT = Australian Capital Territory | |
| NSW = New South Wales | |
| NNSW = Northern New South Wales | FNC = Far North Coast; MNC = Mid North Coast; NC = North Coast; NI = Northern Inland; NTH = North (generally); STH = South |
| NT = Northern Territory | ASP = Alice Springs; DAR = Darwin |
| QLD = Queensland | BNE = Brisbane; CQ = Central Queensland; FNQ = Far North Queensland; GC = Gold Coast; MRF = Mackay Regional Football; NQ = North Queensland; SC = Sunshine Coast; SQL = South Queensland (generally); SWQ = South West Queensland; WB = Wide Bay |
| SA = South Australia | |
| TAS = Tasmania | |
| VIC = Victoria | |
| WA = Western Australia | SW = South West |

== First qualifying round ==
| Fed | Zone | Tie no | Home team (Tier) | Score | Away team (Tier) |
Victoria
| VIC | – | 1 | Twin City Wanderers (9) | 15–0 | Glen Eira FC (12) |
| VIC | – | 2 | Victoria Park (10) | 3–0 | Daylesford and Hepburn United (10) |
| VIC | – | 3 | Forest Rangers (9) | 3–0 | Warrnambool Wolves (9) |
| VIC | – | 4 | Tatura SC (9) | 0–4 | Cobram Roar (9) |

| Fed | Zone | Tie no | Home team (Tier) | Score | Away team (Tier) |
|---|---|---|---|---|---|
| VIC | – | 5 | Myrtleford Savoy (9) | 6–0 | Phillip Island Breakers (9) |
| VIC | – | 6 | Falcons 2000 (9) | 2–1 | Ballarat North United (9) |
| VIC | – | 7 | Shepparton South (9) | 1–4 | Wangaratta City (9) |
| VIC | – | 8 | Waverley Victory (16) | 0–12 | Epsom FC (9) |
| VIC | – | 9 | Irymple Knights (9) | w/o | Warrnambool Rangers (9) |

Notes

- w/o = Walkover

== Second qualifying round ==
| Fed | Zone | Tie no | Home team (Tier) | Score | Away team (Tier) |
Victoria
| VIC | – | 1 | Chelsea FC (8) | w/o | Reservoir Yeti (8) |
Walkover for Chelsea FC – Reservoir Yeti removed.
| VIC | – | 2 | Wangaratta City (9) | 2–3 | Myrtleford Savoy (9) |
| VIC | – | 3 | Bundoora United (8) | 0–2 | Maidstone United (8) |
| VIC | – | 4 | Maribyrnong Greens (8) | 3–5 | Dandenong Warriors (8) |
| VIC | – | 5 | Lara United (8) | 3–1 | Heidelberg Eagles (8) |
| VIC | – | 6 | East Brighton United (8) | 1–1† | Deakin Ducks (8) |
East Brighton United advance 5–3 on penalties.
| VIC | – | 7 | Old Trinity Grammarians (8) | 3–3† | Twin City Wanderers (9) |
Twin City Wanderers advance 4–1 on penalties.
| VIC | – | 8 | Meadow Park (8) | 1–2 | Chisholm United (8) |
| VIC | – | 9 | Drouin Dragons (8) | 1–3 | White Star Dandenong (8) |
| VIC | – | 10 | Spring Hills (8) | 1–2 | Craigieburn City (8) |
| VIC | – | 11 | Kyneton District (8) | 1–3 | East Bentleigh (8) |
| VIC | – | 12 | Melbourne Lions (8) | 1–1† | Pakenham United (8) |
| VIC | – | 13 | Lyndale United (8) | w/o | Glen Waverley (8) |
Melbourne Lions advance 5–4 on penalties.

| Fed | Zone | Tie no | Home team (Tier) | Score | Away team (Tier) |
|---|---|---|---|---|---|
| VIC | – | 14 | Forest Rangers (9) | w/o | Moreland Eagles (8) |
| VIC | – | 15 | Keon Park (8) | 0–6 | Laverton Park (8) |
| VIC | – | 16 | Rowville Eagles (8) | 2–4 | Falcons 2000 (9) |
| VIC | – | 17 | Somerville Eagles (8) | 5–2 | Mitchell Rangers (8) |
| VIC | – | 18 | Epsom FC (9) | 4–2 | Gisborne SC (8) |
| VIC | – | 19 | Irymple Knights (9) | w/o | Bunyip and District Strikers (8) |
| VIC | – | 20 | Thornbury Athletic (8) | 0–4 | Uni Hill Eagles (8) |
| VIC | – | 21 | Plenty Valley Lions (8) | w/o | Cobram Roar (9) |
| VIC | – | 22 | Mt Lilydale Old Collegians (8) | 1–2 | Victoria Park (10) |
| VIC | – | 23 | Waverley Wanderers (8) | 2–1† | Albert Park (8) |
| VIC | – | 24 | Lilydale Eagles (8) | w/o | Casey Panthers (8) |
| VIC | – | 25 | Old Ivanhoe Grammarians (8) | 1–6 | Sandown Lions (8) |
| VIC | – | 26 | Old Mentonians (8) | 0–0 | Keilor Wolves (8) |
Keilor Wolves advance 8–7 on penalties.
| VIC | – | 27 | Swinburne University (8) | 1–2† | Moonee Valley Knights (8) |
| VIC | – | 28 | Monash City (8) | 1–1† | Campbellfield Lions (8) |
Campbellfield Lions advance 4–3 on penalties.

Notes

- w/o = Walkover
- † = After Extra Time

== First round ==
| Fed | Zone | Tie no | Home team (Tier) | Score | Away team (Tier) |
Northern New South Wales
| NNSW | NC | 1 | Westlawn Tigers (4) | 0–9 | Urunga FC (4) |
| NNSW | NC | 2 | Coffs Coast Tigers (4) | 5–1 | Northern Storm Thunder (4) |
| NNSW | NC | 3 | Coffs City United (4) | 10–0 | Grafton United (5) |
| NNSW | NC | 4 | Orara Valley (4) | 4–1 | Maclean FC (4) |
| NNSW | NC | 5 | Boambee FC (4) | 1–3 | Sawtell Scorpions (4) |
Queensland
| QLD | SC | 6 | Gympie United (3) | 1–3 | Buderim Wanderers (3) |
Victoria
| VIC | – | 7 | Moonee Valley Knights (8) | 0–3 | North Melbourne Athletic (7) |
| VIC | – | 8 | Yarra Jets (7) | 1–7 | Bell Park (7) |
| VIC | – | 9 | Maidstone United (8) | 2–2† | White Star Dandenong (8) |
White Star Dandenong advance 4–2 on penalties.
| VIC | – | 10 | Croydon City Arrows (7) | 3–0 | Kings Domain (7) |
| VIC | – | 11 | Point Cook (7) | 0–1 | FC Strathmore (6) |
| VIC | – | 12 | Golden Plains (7) | 2–1 | East Brighton United (8) |
| VIC | – | 13 | Brunswick Zebras (7) | 1–4 | Greenvale United (7) |
| VIC | – | 14 | Lara United (8) | 1–0 | Laverton Park (8) |
| VIC | – | 15 | Baxter SC (7) | 1–3 | Fawkner SC (6) |
| VIC | – | 16 | Harrisfield Hurricanes (7) | 1–2 | Collingwood City (6) |
| VIC | – | 17 | Boroondara Eagles Carey (7) | 1–1† | West Preston (7) |
Boroondara Eagles Carey advance 4–2 on penalties.
| VIC | – | 18 | Uni Hill Eagles (8) | 0–1 | Bayside Argonauts (7) |
| VIC | – | 19 | Melbourne City (6) | 1–2 | Dandenong Warriors (8) |
| VIC | – | 20 | Darebin United (7) | 2–2† | Knox City (6) |
Knox City advance 4–2 on penalties.
| VIC | – | 21 | Balmoral (7) | 3–7 | Brimbank Stallions (6) |
| VIC | – | 22 | Cobram Roar (9) | 3–0 | Middle Park (6) |

| Fed | Zone | Tie no | Home team (Tier) | Score | Away team (Tier) |
|---|---|---|---|---|---|
| VIC | – | 23 | Epping City (6) | 1–4 | Mill Park SC (7) |
| VIC | – | 24 | Old Melburnians (7) | w/o | Forest Rangers (9) |
| VIC | – | 25 | Old Camberwell Grammarians (7) | 2–4 | Cragieburn City (8) |
| VIC | – | 26 | Skye United (6) | 5–3† | Elwood City (7) |
| VIC | – | 27 | Watsonia Heights (7) | 2–1 | Ashburton United (7) |
| VIC | – | 28 | Endeavour Hills (7) | 1–4 | Irymple Knights (9) |
| VIC | – | 29 | Truganina Hornets (7) | 5–2† | Twin City Wanderers (9) |
| VIC | – | 30 | Keysborough (7) | w/o | Sebastopol Vikings (7) |
| VIC | – | 31 | Whitehorse United (7) | 2–1 | Lalor United (7) |
| VIC | – | 32 | Chelsea FC (8) | 3–2 | Endeavour United (7) |
| VIC | – | 33 | Victoria Park (10) | 0–7 | Rosebud Heart (7) |
| VIC | – | 34 | Melbourne University (6) | 1–0† | Sandown Lions (8) |
| VIC | – | 35 | Chisholm United (8) | 7–2 | Melbourne Lions (8) |
| VIC | – | 36 | Casey Panthers (8) | 0–1 | Keilor Wolves (8) |
| VIC | – | 37 | Marcellin Old Collegians (7) | 1–4 | Noble Park (7) |
| VIC | – | 38 | Ringwood City (7) | 1–0 | Myrtleford Savoy (9) |
| VIC | – | 39 | RMIT FC (7) | 2–1 | Melton Phoenix (7) |
| VIC | – | 40 | Glen Waverley (8) | 3–4† | Western Eagles (7) |
| VIC | – | 41 | Old Xaverians (7) | 1–0 | Campbellfield Lions (8) |
| VIC | – | 42 | North City Wolves (7) | 3–2 | Springvale City SC (7) |
| VIC | – | 43 | St Kevins Old Boys (7) | 2–0 | Hampton Park United Sparrows (7) |
| VIC | – | 44 | Monash University (7) | 4–0 | Newmarket Phoenix (7) |
| VIC | – | 45 | Dandenong South (7) | 3–2 | Epsom FC (9) |
| VIC | – | 46 | Somerville Eagles (8) | 1–2 | Falcons 2000 (9) |
| VIC | – | 47 | Northern Falcons (7) | 8–4† | Altona North (7) |
| VIC | – | 48 | Waverley Wanderers (7) | 1–4 | Riversdale (6) |
| VIC | – | 49 | Healesville (7) | 2–3† | Brandon Park (6) |
| VIC | – | 50 | East Bentleigh Strikers (8) | 2–1 | Surf Coast (7) |

Notes

- w/o = Walkover
- † = After Extra Time
- QLD Byes – Beerwah Glasshouse United (3), Bribie Island Tigers (6), Caloundra FC (3), Kawana FC (3), Maroochydore FC (3), Noosa Lions (3) and Woombye FC (3).

== Second round ==
| Fed | Zone | Tie no | Home team (Tier) | Score | Away team (Tier) |
New South Wales
| NSW | – | 1 | Bankstown RSL Dragons (8) | 0–5 | Padstow United (6) |
| NSW | – | 2 | Gladesville Ravens (6) | 4–2 | Maroubra United (6) |
| NSW | – | 3 | Norwest FC (7) | 2–3 | Gerringong Breakers (6) |
| NSW | – | 4 | Amity FC (-) | 6–2 | North Rocks (-) |
| NSW | – | 5 | Chatswood Rangers (-) | 1–1† | Abbotsford FC (-) |
Abbotsford FC won 5–3 on penalties, however were removed from competition for fielding ineligible players.
| NSW | – | 6 | Pagewood Botany (-) | 6–0 | Bankstown Sports Strikers (7) |
| NSW | – | 7 | Lindfield FC (-) | 1–3† | Pennant Hills (6) |
| NSW | – | 8 | Lilli Pilli (6) | 5–1 | Roselands FC (-) |
| NSW | – | 9 | Lokomotiv Cove (6) | 6–0 | Tumut Eagles (-) |
Northern New South Wales
| NNSW | MNC | 10 | Wauchope SC (4) | 2–9 | Macleay Valley Rangers (4) |
| NNSW | MNC | 11 | Wallis Lake (4) | 0–2 | Taree Wildcats (4) |
| NNSW | MNC | 12 | Tuncurry Forster (4) | 2–2† | Kempsey Saints (4) |
Tuncurry Forster advance 4–3 on penalties.
| NNSW | NI | 13 | Demon Knights (4) | 7–2 | The Armidale School (5) |
| NNSW | NI | 14 | North Companions (4) | 2–2† | South Armidale United (4) |
South Armidale United advance 5–3 on penalties.
| NNSW | NI | 15 | Oxley Vale Attunga (4) | 7–0 | East Armidale United (4) |
| NNSW | NI | 16 | Quirindi FC (5) | 1–3 | Norths United (4) |
| NNSW | NC | 17 | Orara Valley (4) | 0–4 | Coffs City United (4) |
| NNSW | NC | 18 | Sawtell Scorpions (4) | 0–1 | Coffs Coast Tigers (4) |
| NNSW | FNC | 19 | Lennox Head (5) | 1–4 | Bangalow (4) |
| NNSW | FNC | 20 | Tintenbar East Ballina (5) | 0–1 | Italo Stars (4) |
| NNSW | FNC | 21 | Lismore Thistles (4) | 0–3 | Byron Bay Rams (4) |
| NNSW | FNC | 22 | Alstonville (4) | 4–1 | Ballina (5) |
| NNSW | STH | 23 | Westlakes Wildcats (6) | 2–1 | Hamilton Azzurri (6) |
| NNSW | STH | 24 | Dudley Redhead United (4) | 8–0 | Mayfield United Junior (7) |
| NNSW | STH | 25 | Hunter Simba (6) | 2–2† | Maryland Fletcher (6) |
Hunter Simba advance 4–2 on penalties.
| NNSW | STH | 26 | Beresfield United Senior (4) | 1–3 | Warners Bay (5) |
| NNSW | STH | 27 | Jesmond FC (5) | 1–0 | Kotara South (5) |
| NNSW | STH | 28 | Dudley Redhead Senior (7) | 1–1† | Garden Suburb (4) |
Dudley Redhead Senior advance 4–1 on penalties.
| NNSW | STH | 29 | Barnsley United (5) | 2–0 | Newcastle University (4) |
| NNSW | STH | 30 | Beresfield FC (5) | 1–9 | Newcastle Suns (4) |
| NNSW | STH | 31 | Mayfield United Senior (4) | 6–0 | Morisset United (4) |
| NNSW | STH | 32 | Charlestown Junior (5) | 0–8 | Cardiff City (4) |
| NNSW | STH | 33 | Argenton United JSC (6) | 4–1 | Merewether Advance (6) |
| NNSW | STH | 34 | Bolwarra Lorn (7) | 2–2† | Edgeworth Junior (7) |
Edgeworth Junior advance 5–4 on penalties.
| NNSW | STH | 35 | Muswellbrook FC (6) | 1–1† | Swansea FC (4) |
Swansea FC advance 4–1 on penalties.
| NNSW | STH | 36 | Raymond Terrace (5) | 8–1 | Nelson Bay (5) |
Queensland
| QLD | BNE | 37 | Brighton Bulldogs (7) | 0–2 | Bethania Rams (7) |
| QLD | BNE | 38 | Moggill FC (4) | 2–3 | Annerley (5) |
| QLD | BNE | 39 | Kangaroo Point Rovers (7) | 1–4† | Pine Hills (5) |
| QLD | BNE | 40 | Newmarket SFC (6) | 0–6 | The Gap (4) |
| QLD | BNE | 41 | Ipswich City (5) | 2–1† | AC Carina (6) |
| QLD | BNE | 42 | Caboolture Sports (6) | 1–2 | Centenary Stormers (5) |
| QLD | BNE | 43 | New Farm United (5) | 4–3 | Westside FC (6) |
| QLD | BNE | 44 | Toowong FC (5) | 2–1 | Logan Metro (7) |
| QLD | BNE | 45 | Virginia United (5) | 13–0 | Western Spirit (5) |
| QLD | BNE | 46 | North Brisbane (7) | 2–4† | Redcliffe PCYC (6) |
| QLD | BNE | 47 | Clairvaux (6) | 0–5 | Brisbane Force (5) |
| QLD | BNE | 48 | Mount Gravatt Hawks (4) | 4–2 | Slacks Creek (6) |
| QLD | BNE | 49 | Jimboomba United (6) | 1–4 | Springfield United (7) |
| QLD | BNE | 50 | Mooroondu (7) | 1–2 | Park Ridge (5) |
| QLD | BNE | 51 | Tarragindi Tigers (6) | 5–4 | Oxley United (5) |
| QLD | BNE | 52 | Bardon Latrobe (6) | 0–3 | St. George Willawong (6) |
| QLD | BNE | 53 | The Lakes (7) | 0–10 | Acacia Ridge (4) |
| QLD | BNE | 54 | Narangba United (6) | 1–2 | Pine Rivers United (5) |
| QLD | BNE | 55 | Logan Village (7) | 1–5 | Samford Rangers (7) |
| QLD | FNQ | 56 | Southside Comets (3) | 3–2 | Marlin Coast Rangers (3) |
| QLD | FNQ | 57 | Leichhardt Lions (3) | 0–4 | Mareeba United (3) |
| QLD | FNQ | 58 | Edge Hill United (3) | 1–7 | Stratford Dolphins (3) |
| QLD | FNQ | 59 | Innisfail United (3) | 18–2 | JCU Cairns FC (4) |
| QLD | SC | 60 | Buderim Wanderers (3) | 1–3 | Kawana FC (3) |
| QLD | SC | 61 | Caloundra (3) | 0–0† | Noosa Lions (3) |
Caloundra advance 5–4 on penalties.

| Fed | Zone | Tie no | Home team (Tier) | Score | Away team (Tier) |
|---|---|---|---|---|---|
| QLD | SC | 62 | Maroochydore (3) | 3–1 | Beerwah Glasshouse United (3) |
| QLD | SC | 63 | Bribie Island Tigers (6) | 0–7 | Woombye (3) |
| QLD | GC | 64 | Palm Beach Sharks (3) | 3–1 | Magic United (3) |
| QLD | GC | 65 | Broadbeach United (3) | 3–1 | Coomera Colts (3) |
| QLD | GC | 66 | Tweed United (4) | 0–10 | Surfers Paradise Apollo (3) |
| QLD | GC | 67 | Gold Coast Knights (3) | 4–2 | Murwillumbah SC (3) |
| QLD | SWQ | 68 | Saint Albans SC (3) | 2–5 | West Wanderers FC (3) |
| QLD | SWQ | 69 | Willowburn FC (3) | 0–1 | Rockville Rovers FC (3) |
| QLD | SWQ | 70 | University of Southern Queensland (3) | 5–1 | Warwick Wolves (3) |
| QLD | SWQ | 71 | Highfields FC (4) | 1–8 | Gatton FC (3) |
South Australia
| SA | – | 72 | Fulham United (4) | 9–1 | Apollo Mount Gambier (5) |
| SA | – | 73 | Mount Barker United (4) | 1–6 | Gawler SC (4) |
| SA | – | 74 | Adelaide Vipers (4) | 1–0 | Modbury Vista (4) |
| SA | – | 75 | International Mount Gambier (5) | 4–3† | Rostrevor Old Collegians (5) |
| SA | – | 76 | Adelaide University (4) | 5–1 | Seaford Rangers (4) |
| SA | – | 77 | Northern Demons (4) | 8–2 | UniSA FC (4) |
| SA | – | 78 | Eastern United (4) | 1–4 | Western Strikers (3) |
| SA | – | 79 | Playford City Patriots (4) | w/o | Gambier Centrals (5) |
| SA | – | 80 | Barmera United (5) | 1–4 | Renmark Olympic (5) |
| SA | – | 81 | Adelaide Cobras (4) | 4–2† | Mercedes Old Collegians (5) |
Victoria
| VIC | – | 82 | Altona City (5) | 2–1 | Williamstown SC (6) |
| VIC | – | 83 | Bell Park (7) | 0–2 | Doncaster Rovers (5) |
| VIC | – | 84 | Rosebud Heart (7) | 3–1 | Dandenong Warriors (8) |
| VIC | – | 85 | Whittlesea United (6) | 4–3 | Heidelberg Stars (6) |
| VIC | – | 86 | Western Eagles (7) | 0–3 | Monash University (7) |
| VIC | – | 87 | Noble Park (7) | w/o | Eltham Redbacks (5) |
| VIC | – | 88 | Mill Park (7) | 2–0 | Fawkner SC (6) |
| VIC | – | 89 | Northern Falcons (7) | 1–5 | Sporting Whittlesea (5) |
| VIC | – | 90 | FC Strathmore (6) | 0–1 | Knox City (6) |
| VIC | – | 91 | Beaumaris SC (5) | w/o | Falcons 2000 (9) |
| VIC | – | 92 | Upfield SC (6) | 1–1† | Noble Park United (6) |
Upfield SC advance 4–2 on penalties.
| VIC | – | 93 | Westvale SC (5) | 5–0 | Irymple Knights (9) |
| VIC | – | 94 | Hoppers Crossing (5) | 2–0 | Old Scotch (5) |
| VIC | – | 95 | Old Xaverians (7) | 3–2 | Watsonia Heights (7) |
| VIC | – | 96 | Golden Plains (7) | 1–3 | Hume United (5) |
| VIC | – | 97 | East Bentleigh Strikers (8) | 1–2 | Sunbury United (6) |
| VIC | – | 98 | Fitzroy City (5) | 1–0 | Berwick City (5) |
| VIC | – | 99 | Brandon Park (6) | 2–1 | Doveton SC (5) |
| VIC | – | 100 | Geelong Rangers (5) | w/o | Cobram Roar (9) |
| VIC | – | 101 | Frankston Pines (5) | 2–4 | Seaford United (5) |
| VIC | – | 102 | Essendon United (5) | 3–0 | Truganina Hornets (7) |
| VIC | – | 103 | Collingwood City (6) | 1–2† | La Trobe University (6) |
| VIC | – | 104 | Chelsea FC (8) | 5–0 | Sandringham (6) |
| VIC | – | 105 | Cairnlea FC (5) | 6–0 | Diamond Valley United (5) |
| VIC | – | 106 | Peninsula Strikers (5) | 2–0 | Brimbank Stallions (6) |
| VIC | – | 107 | Skye United (6) | 9–0 | Forest Rangers (9) |
| VIC | – | 108 | Dingley Stars (6) | 1–3 | RMIT FC (7) |
| VIC | – | 109 | Bayside Argonauts (7) | 4–1 | Sebastopol Vikings (7) |
| VIC | – | 110 | Heatherton United (5) | w/o | North City Wolves (7) |
| VIC | – | 111 | Cragieburn City (8) | 0–2 | Monbulk Rangers (6) |
| VIC | – | 112 | North Melbourne Athletic (7) | 3–2 | Riversdale (6) |
| VIC | – | 113 | South Yarra (6) | 0–1 | North Caulfield (5) |
| VIC | – | 114 | Brighton SC (6) | 3–5† | Dandenong South (7) |
| VIC | – | 115 | Croydon City Arrows (7) | 5–0 | Lara United (8) |
| VIC | – | 116 | Ringwood City (7) | 0–1 | Boroondara Eagles Carey (7) |
| VIC | – | 117 | Mazenod United (5) | 3–0 | Keilor Wolves (8) |
| VIC | – | 118 | White Star Dandenong (8) | 0–3 | Melbourne University (6) |
| VIC | – | 119 | Chisholm United (8) | 6–4 | Greenvale United (7) |
| VIC | – | 120 | St Kevins Old Boys (7) | 0–5 | Corio SC (5) |
| VIC | – | 121 | Moreland United (5) | 0–1 | Whitehorse United (7) |
Western Australia
| WA | SW | 122 | Bunbury Dynamos (-) | 0–3 | Busselton SC (-) |
| WA | SW | 123 | Dalyellup Park Rangers (-) | 3–0 | Bunbury United (-) |
| WA | – | 124 | Kalamunda United (13) | w/o | Canning Buffers (-) |
| WA | – | 125 | Cracovia White Eagles (7) | 1–2 | Ballajura AFC (7) |
| WA | – | 126 | Metro Elephant Warriors (12) | 1–6 | Woodvale (9) |
| WA | – | 127 | Joondanna Blues (10) | 2–0 | BrOzzy Sports Club (12) |
| WA | – | 128 | Warnbro Strikers SC (7) | 2–0 | Phoenix Glory SC (11) |

Notes

- w/o = Walkover
- † = After Extra Time
- NNSW Byes – Port Saints (4), Stockton Sharks (5) and Urunga FC (4).
- WA Byes – Albany Bayswater (-), Albany Rovers (-) and Boulder City (-).

== Third round ==
| Fed | Zone | Tie no | Home team (Tier) | Score | Away team (Tier) |
Australian Capital Territory
| ACT | – | 1 | Lanyon United (-) | 2–0 | Narrabundah FC (3) |
| ACT | – | 2 | White Eagles (3) | 7–1 | Burns FC (-) |
| ACT | – | 3 | Weston Molonglo (3) | 5–3 | Brindabella Blues (3) |
| ACT | – | 4 | Goulburn Strikers (-) | 4–3† | Goulburn Stags (-) |
New South Wales
| NSW | – | 5 | Baulkham Hills (-) | 5–0 | West Ryde Rovers (6) |
| NSW | – | 6 | Auburn FC (-) | 2–5† | Glebe Gorillas (6) |
| NSW | – | 7 | Camden Tigers (5) | 9–1 | Carlton Rovers (-) |
| NSW | – | 8 | Inter Lions (4) | w/o | Northbridge FC (-) |
| NSW | – | 9 | Albion Park White Eagles (6) | 9–0 | Peakhurst United (-) |
| NSW | – | 10 | Hawkesbury City (4) | 1–0 | Gladesville Ryde Magic (4) |
| NSW | – | 11 | Macquarie Dragons (-) | 0–7 | University of NSW (5) |
| NSW | – | 12 | Inter Lions (CDSFA) (-) | w/o | Avalon SC (7) |
| NSW | – | 13 | Kemblawarra Fury (6) | 2–1 | Coogee United (6) |
| NSW | – | 14 | Dulwich Hill (4) | 1–0 | West Pymble (-) |
| NSW | – | 15 | St Patricks FC (GHFA) (-) | 4–1 | Riverstone Schofields (-) |
| NSW | – | 16 | Sydney North West (-) | 0–3 | Picton Rangers (6) |
| NSW | – | 17 | Marayong FC (6) | 2–6† | Gosford City (6) |
| NSW | – | 18 | Glenwood Redbacks (6) | w/o | FC Danphe (-) |
| NSW | – | 19 | Harrington United (-) | 0–5 | Sporting Rovers (-) |
| NSW | – | 20 | St George City (4) | 5–0 | The Entrance Bateau Bay United (6) |
| NSW | – | 21 | Kirrawee Kangaroos (6) | 8–1 | Woy Woy FC (-) |
| NSW | – | 22 | Strathfield FC (-) | 3–4 | Minchinbury Jets (-) |
| NSW | – | 23 | North Ryde (-) | 2–10 | Pennant Hills (6) |
| NSW | – | 24 | Lokomotiv Cove (6) | 4–0 | Ararat FC (-) |
| NSW | – | 25 | Revesby Rovers (7) | 0–5 | Wagga City Wanderers (5) |
| NSW | – | 26 | Mosman FC (6) | 6–0 | Lugarno FC (-) |
| NSW | – | 27 | Cranebrook United (-) | 1–4 | North Epping Rangers (6) |
| NSW | – | 28 | Lilli Pilli (6) | 6–0 | Greenacre Eagles (-) |
| NSW | – | 29 | Southern and Ettalong United (6) | 4–4† | Amity FC (-) |
Southern and Ettalong United advance 9–8 on penalties.
| NSW | – | 30 | Winston Hills (6) | 1–0 | FC Gazy Lansvale (5) |
| NSW | – | 31 | Dunbar Rovers (4) | 5–1 | Banksia Tigers (-) |
| NSW | – | 32 | Dunbar Rovers (ESFA) (6) | 6–0 | Putney Rangers (-) |
| NSW | – | 33 | Kellyville Kolts (-) | 5–1 | Terrigal United (6) |
| NSW | – | 34 | Lake Albert (-) | 4–0 | Balmain & Districts (-) |
| NSW | – | 35 | Wollongong United (6) | 9–0 | The Ponds (6) |
| NSW | – | 36 | Western Condors (5) | 3–2† | Epping Eastwood (6) |
| NSW | – | 37 | Sydney University (4) | 2–3 | Dee Why FC (-) |
| NSW | – | 38 | Hurstville City Minotaurs (5) | 5–6 | Doonside Hawks (6) |
| NSW | – | 39 | Randwick City (-) | 0–5 | Fraser Park (4) |
| NSW | – | 40 | Rydalmere Lions (4) | 1–2 | Gladesville Ravens (6) |
| NSW | – | 41 | Arncliffe Scots (-) | 4–2 | Narellan Rangers (-) |
| NSW | – | 42 | Nepean FC (5) | 11–2 | Padstow United (6) |
| NSW | – | 43 | Sydney CBD FC (6) | 0–5 | Bulli FC (6) |
| NSW | – | 44 | Forest Rangers (-) | 0–2 | Hurstville ZFC (5) |
| NSW | – | 45 | St Patricks FC (BDSFA) (6) | 1–7 | Waverley Old Boys (6) |
| NSW | – | 46 | Lane Cove (-) | 2–0 | Blue Mountains (-) |
| NSW | – | 47 | Glenmore Park (-) | 0–1 | East Gosford (-) |
| NSW | – | 48 | Southern Raiders (4) | 5–1 | Balmain Tigers (4) |
| NSW | – | 49 | Quakers Hill Tigers (6) | 1–12 | Stanmore Hawks (4) |
| NSW | – | 50 | Sydney Dragon (-) | 3–8 | Killarney District (6) |
| NSW | – | 51 | Pagewood Botany (-) | 0–1 | Quakers Hill JSC (6) |
| NSW | – | 52 | Oatley FC (-) | 6–1 | Wagga United (-) |
| NSW | – | 53 | Kenthurst and District (-) | 1–5 | Prospect United (5) |
| NSW | – | 54 | Carss Park (-) | 0–5 | West Pennant Hills Cherrybrook (6) |
| NSW | – | 55 | Glenhaven FC (-) | 0–3 | Western NSW Mariners (4) |
| NSW | – | 56 | Ourimbah United (-) | w/o | Granville Rage (4) |
| NSW | – | 57 | Berkeley Vale (-) | 6–0 | Penrith Rovers (-) |
| NSW | – | 58 | George's River Thistle (-) | 1–3 | Leichhardt Saints (SPL) (6) |
| NSW | – | 59 | Bankstown United (5) | 5–0 | Gerringong Breakers (6) |
| NSW | – | 60 | St Augustine's FC (-) | 8–1 | Leichhardt Saints (CDSFA) (-) |
| NSW | – | 61 | West Pennant Hills Redbacks (-) | 0–5 | Chatswood Rangers (-) |
| NSW | – | 62 | Padstow Hornets (-) | 8–0 | Wentworth Falls (-) |
Northern New South Wales
| NNSW | MNC | 63 | Taree Wildcats (4) | 2–0 | Port Saints (4) |
| NNSW | MNC | 64 | Tuncurry Forster (4) | 1–3 | Macleay Valley Rangers (4) |
| NNSW | NI | 65 | South Armidale United (4) | 1–3 | Oxley Vale Attunga (4) |
| NNSW | NI | 66 | Norths United (4) | 1–1† | Demon Knights (4) |
Demon Knights advance 3–1 on penalties.
| NNSW | NC | 67 | Coffs Coast Tigers (4) | 1–1† | Urunga FC (4) |
Coffs Coast Tigers advance 4–2 on penalties.
| NNSW | FNC | 68 | Alstonville FC (4) | 1–2 | Bangalow SC (4) |
| NNSW | FNC | 69 | Italo Stars FC (4) | 0–8 | Byron Bay Rams (4) |
| NNSW | STH | 70 | Barnsley United (5) | 0–1 | Warners Bay (5) |
| NNSW | STH | 71 | Cardiff City (4) | 4–1 | Westlakes Wildcats (6) |
| NNSW | STH | 72 | Kahibah FC (3) | 4–0 | Edgeworth Junior (7) |
| NNSW | STH | 73 | Cessnock City Hornets (3) | 3–0 | Jesmond FC (5) |
| NNSW | STH | 74 | South Cardiff (3) | 1–1† | Belmont Swansea United (3) |
Belmont Swansea United advance 6–5 on penalties.
| NNSW | STH | 75 | Raymond Terrace (5) | 2–2† | Thornton Redbacks (3) |
Thornton Redbacks advance 5–3 on penalties.
| NNSW | STH | 76 | Dudley Redhead Senior (7) | 11–1 | Dudley Redhead United (4) |
| NNSW | STH | 77 | West Wallsend (3) | 3–4 | Singleton Strikers (3) |
| NNSW | STH | 78 | Stockton Sharks (5) | 4–4† | New Lambton (3) |
New Lambton advance 4–1 on penalties.
| NNSW | STH | 79 | Swansea FC (4) | 3–3† | Cooks Hill United (3) |
Cooks Hill United advance 4–2 on penalties.
| NNSW | STH | 80 | Toronto Awaba Stags (3) | 1–5 | Newcastle Suns (4) |
| NNSW | STH | 81 | Mayfield United Senior (4) | 7–1 | Hunter Simba (6) |
| NNSW | STH | 82 | Argenton United JSC (6) | 2–2† | Wallsend FC (3) |
Wallsend FC advance 4–3 on penalties.
Northern Territory
| NT | DAR | 83 | Hellenic AC (2) | 10–0 | University Azzurri (2) |
| NT | DAR | 84 | Palmerston FC (3) | 0–7 | Casuarina FC (2) |
| NT | DAR | 85 | Port Darwin (2) | 1–2 | Mindil Aces (2) |
Queensland
| QLD | BNE | 86 | New Farm United (5) | 0–4 | Peninsula Power (3) |
| QLD | BNE | 87 | Springfield United (7) | 0–6 | Albany Creek (3) |
| QLD | BNE | 88 | Ipswich City (5) | 3–1 | Bethania Rams (7) |
| QLD | BNE | 89 | Taringa Rovers (4) | 4–1 | Acacia Ridge (4) |
| QLD | BNE | 90 | Annerley FC (5) | 0–4 | Souths United (3) |
| QLD | BNE | 91 | Rochedale Rovers (3) | 9–0 | Pine Hills (5) |
| QLD | BNE | 92 | Brisbane Force (5) | 4–1† | Mount Gravatt Hawks (4) |
| QLD | BNE | 93 | St. George Willawong (6) | 3–4 | North Pine United (4) |
| QLD | BNE | 94 | Samford Rangers (7) | 3–4† | University of Queensland (4) |
| QLD | BNE | 95 | WDSC Wolves (4) | 4–3 | Eastern Suburbs (3) |

| Fed | Zone | Tie no | Home team (Tier) | Score | Away team (Tier) |
|---|---|---|---|---|---|
| QLD | BNE | 96 | Centenary Stormers (5) | 6–2 | Redcliffe PCYC (6) |
| QLD | BNE | 97 | The Gap (4) | 5–0 | Pine Rivers United (5) |
| QLD | BNE | 98 | Holland Park Hawks (3) | 3–2† | Ipswich Knights (3) |
| QLD | BNE | 99 | Southside Eagles (4) | 1–0† | Bayside United (4) |
| QLD | BNE | 100 | Tarragindi Tigers (6) | 0–5 | Mitchelton FC (3) |
| QLD | BNE | 101 | Queensland Lions (3) | 1–3 | Brisbane Knights (4) |
| QLD | BNE | 102 | Logan Lightning (3) | 6–0 | Virginia United (5) |
| QLD | BNE | 103 | Park Ridge (5) | 1–11 | Grange Thistle (3) |
| QLD | BNE | 104 | North Star (4) | 1–2 | Capalaba FC (3) |
| QLD | FNQ | 105 | Stratford Dolphins (3) | 2–3 | Mareeba United (3) |
| QLD | FNQ | 106 | Innisfail United (3) | 3–0 | Southside Comets (3) |
| QLD | NQ | 107 | Saints Eagles South (3) | 0–4 | Rebels Gunners (3) |
| QLD | NQ | 108 | Brothers Townsville (3) | 1–2 | MA Olympic (3) |
| QLD | CQ | 109 | Capricorn Coast (3) | 3–0 | Bluebirds United (3) |
| QLD | CQ | 110 | Frenchville FC (3) | 7–0 | Southside United (3) |
| QLD | CQ | 111 | Nerimbera FC (3) | 1–6 | Clinton FC (3) |
| QLD | MRF | 112 | Mackay Magpies (3) | 7–1 | Whitsunday FC (3) |
| QLD | SC | 113 | Caloundra (3) | 4–2 | Maroochydore (3) |
| QLD | SC | 114 | Woombye (3) | 3–2 | Kawana FC (3) |
| QLD | WB | 115 | Brothers Aston Villa (3) | 3–0 | Kawungan Sandy Straits (3) |
| QLD | WB | 116 | Doon Villa (3) | 3–2 | United Park Eagles (3) |
| QLD | GC | 117 | Palm Beach Sharks (3) | 2–3 | Gold Coast Knights (3) |
| QLD | GC | 118 | Broadbeach United (3) | 0–2 | Surfers Paradise Apollo (3) |
| QLD | SWQ | 119 | University of Southern Queensland (3) | 3–1 | Rockville Rovers FC (3) |
| QLD | SWQ | 120 | West Wanderers FC (3) | 1–2 | Gatton FC (3) |
South Australia
| SA | – | 121 | Playford City Patriots (4) | 2–5 | Gawler SC (4) |
| SA | – | 122 | Adelaide Hills Hawks (3) | 1–3 | Adelaide Comets (2) |
| SA | – | 123 | Adelaide Vipers (4) | 0–2 | Western Strikers (3) |
| SA | – | 124 | Adelaide City (2) | 7–0 | Adelaide Cobras (4) |
| SA | – | 125 | Sturt Lions (3) | 2–8 | Para Hills Knights (2) |
| SA | – | 126 | Northern Demons (4) | 0–1 | Adelaide University (4) |
| SA | – | 127 | Port Adelaide Pirates (3) | 2– 5 | Croydon Kings (2) |
| SA | – | 128 | Cumberland United (2) | 14–2 | International Mount Gambier (5) |
| SA | – | 129 | Noarlunga United (3) | 1–2 | Modbury Jets (3) |
| SA | – | 130 | Adelaide Victory (3) | 7–0 | Fulham United (4) |
| SA | – | 131 | The Cove (3) | 3–4† | West Torrens Birkalla (2) |
| SA | – | 132 | North Eastern MetroStars (2) | 3–3† | Adelaide Olympic (2) |
North Eastern MetroStars advance 4–2 on penalties.
| SA | – | 133 | Campbelltown City (2) | 9–1 | Salisbury United (3) |
| SA | – | 134 | West Adelaide (2) | 5–2 | South Adelaide (3) |
| SA | – | 135 | Renmark Olympic (5) | 0–11 | Adelaide Blue Eagles (2) |
| SA | – | 136 | White City (3) | 1–0 | Adelaide Raiders (3) |
Tasmania
| TAS | – | 137 | Riverside Olympic (3) | 0–1 | Ulverstone FC (3) |
| TAS | – | 138 | Metro FC (3) | 2–3 | Launceston United (3) |
| TAS | – | 139 | Taroona FC (3) | 0–1 | Nelson Eastern Suburbs (3) |
| TAS | – | 140 | Hobart United (3) | 9–3 | New Town Eagles (3) |
Victoria
| VIC | – | 141 | Monbulk Rangers (6) | 2–1 | Caulfield United Cobras (4) |
| VIC | – | 142 | Casey Comets (4) | 3–3† | Whittlesea United (6) |
Casey Comets advance 6–5 on penalties.
| VIC | – | 143 | Sporting Whittlesea (5) | 1–6 | Corio SC (5) |
| VIC | – | 144 | Melbourne University (6) | 0–3 | Western Suburbs (4) |
| VIC | – | 145 | Geelong SC (4) | 3–1 | Beaumaris SC (5) |
| VIC | – | 146 | Manningham United (4) | 3–1 | Mazenod United (5) |
| VIC | – | 147 | Dandenong South (7) | 0–6 | Warragul United (4) |
| VIC | – | 148 | Yarraville FC (4) | 4–3 | Keilor Park (4) |
| VIC | – | 149 | Mornington SC (4) | 2–1† | Malvern City (4) |
| VIC | – | 150 | Banyule City (4) | 5–0 | Upfield SC (6) |
| VIC | – | 151 | Chisholm United (8) | 1–5 | Mooroolbark (4) |
| VIC | – | 152 | Essendon United (5) | 8–1 | Seaford United (5) |
| VIC | – | 153 | Old Xaverians (7) | 0–2 | North Caulfield (5) |
| VIC | – | 154 | Essendon Royals (4) | 2–6 | North Sunshine Eagles (4) |
| VIC | – | 155 | Altona City (5) | 2–0 | Skye United (6) |
| VIC | – | 156 | Sydenham Park (4) | 2–2† | Sunbury United (6) |
Sunbury United advance 6–5 on penalties.
| VIC | – | 157 | St Kilda (4) | 3–0 | Monash University (7) |
| VIC | – | 158 | Knox City (6) | 3–3† | Geelong Rangers (5) |
Knox City advance 7–6 on penalties.
| VIC | – | 159 | Bayside Argonauts (7) | 2–3† | RMIT FC (7) |
| VIC | – | 160 | Preston Lions (4) | 3–2† | Clifton Hill (4) |
| VIC | – | 161 | Westvale SC (5) | 1–2 | Boroondara Eagles Carey (7) |
| VIC | – | 162 | North Melbourne Athletic (7) | 1–5 | Langwarrin (4) |
| VIC | – | 163 | Mill Park (7) | 5–1 | Chelsea FC (8) |
| VIC | – | 164 | Morwell Pegasus (4) | 5–1 | La Trobe University (6) |
| VIC | – | 165 | Altona East Phoenix (4) | 2–1 | Rosebud Heart (7) |
| VIC | – | 166 | Hoppers Crossing (5) | 4–1 | Whitehorse United (7) |
| VIC | – | 167 | Cairnlea FC (5) | 1–0 | Fitzroy City (5) |
| VIC | – | 168 | Brandon Park (6) | 2–6 | Eltham Redbacks (5) |
| VIC | – | 169 | North City Wolves (7) | 1–8 | Altona Magic (4) |
| VIC | – | 170 | Hume United (5) | 3–1 | Croydon City Arrows (7) |
| VIC | – | 171 | Westgate (4) | 1–0 | Doncaster Rovers (5) |
| VIC | – | 172 | Peninsula Strikers (5) | 2–4 | South Springvale (4) |
Western Australia
| WA | – | 173 | Woodvale FC (9) | 10–1 | Albany Rovers (-) |
| WA | – | 174 | Canning City (3) | 2–3 | Wanneroo City (4) |
| WA | – | 175 | Albany Bayswater (-) | 0–7 | Melville City (4) |
| WA | – | 176 | Busselton SC (-) | 3–3† | Hamersley Rovers (5) |
Busselton SC advance 5–4 on penalties.
| WA | – | 177 | Gwelup Croatia (4) | 11–0 | Dalyellup Park Rangers (-) |
| WA | – | 178 | Dianella White Eagles (3) | 5–1 | Ashfield (3) |
| WA | – | 179 | Quinns FC (4) | 1–3 | UWA-Nedlands (3) |
| WA | – | 180 | Forrestfield United (3) | 2–1 | Curtin University (4) |
| WA | – | 181 | South West Phoenix (3) | 6–3 | Kelmscott Roos (4) |
| WA | – | 182 | Rockingham City (3) | 9–0 | Kalamunda United (13) |
Rockingham City removed from competition for breaching regulations.
| WA | – | 183 | Joondalup City (4) | 8–0 | Ballajura AFC (7) |
| WA | – | 184 | Olympic Kingsway (4) | 0–3 | Western Knights (3) |
| WA | – | 185 | Gosnells City (3) | 1–4 | Kingsley SC (5) |
| WA | – | 186 | Boulder City (-) | w/o | Shamrock Rovers Perth (4) |
| WA | – | 187 | Wembley Downs (5) | 1–0 | Joondanna Blues (10) |
| WA | – | 188 | Warnbro Strikers SC (7) | 3–3† | Swan United (4) |
Swan United advance 6–5 on penalties.
| WA | – | 189 | Kwinana United (5) | 0–3 | Fremantle City (3) |
| WA | – | 190 | Balga SC (4) | 1–4 | Southern Spirit (5) |
| WA | – | 191 | Morley-Windmills (4) | 3–2 | Perth Royals (5) |

notes

- w/o = Walkover
- † = After Extra Time
- ACT Byes – Australian National University (3), O'Connor Knights (3) and Queanbeyan City (3).
- NNSW Byes – Coffs City United (4).
- QLD Byes – Across The Waves (3), Emerald Eagles (3), Mackay City Brothers (3), Mackay Lions (3), Mackay Wanderers (3), Toowong FC (5) and United Warriors (3).

== Fourth round ==
| Fed | Zone | Tie no | Home team (Tier) | Score | Away team (Tier) |
Australian Capital Territory
| ACT | – | 1 | Riverina Rhinos (2) | 2–0 | Weston Molonglo (3) |
| ACT | – | 2 | Lanyon United (-) | 0–2 | Tuggeranong United (2) |
| ACT | – | 3 | Woden Weston (2) | 4–1 | Queanbeyan City (3) |
| ACT | – | 4 | Canberra Olympic (2) | 6–0 | Goulburn Strikers (-) |
| ACT | – | 5 | White Eagles (3) | 0–5 | Canberra FC (2) |
| ACT | – | 6 | Tigers FC (2) | 3–1 | ANU FC (3) |
| ACT | – | 7 | Belconnen United (2) | 1–1† | Monaro Panthers (2) |
Monaro Panthers advance 3–1 on penalties.
| ACT | – | 8 | O'Connor Knights (3) | 1–7 | Gungahlin United (2) |
New South Wales
| NSW | – | 9 | Camden Tigers (5) | 4–1 | Chatswood Rangers (6) |
| NSW | – | 10 | Sydney Olympic (2) | 7–1 | Mosman FC (6) |
| NSW | – | 11 | GHFA Spirit (3) | 0–1 | Fraser Park (4) |
| NSW | – | 12 | Stanmore Hawks (4) | 0–2 | St George (3) |
| NSW | – | 13 | Dunbar Rovers (ESFA) (6) | 4–3† | Berkeley Vale (-) |
| NSW | – | 14 | Western Condors (5) | 1–2 | Southern and Ettalong United (6) |
| NSW | – | 15 | Sporting Rovers (-) | 0–7 | Northern Tigers (3) |
| NSW | – | 16 | Mounties Wanderers (3) | 2–1 | St Patricks FC (GHFA) (-) |
| NSW | – | 17 | Rockdale City Suns (2) | 4–1 | Hurstville ZFC (5) |
| NSW | – | 18 | Western NSW Mariners (4) | 4–0 | Pennant Hills (6) |
| NSW | – | 19 | Inter Lions (4) | 1–6† | Hakoah Sydney City East (2) |
| NSW | – | 20 | Wagga City Wanderers (5) | 3–0 | Avalon SC (7) |
| NSW | – | 21 | North Shore Mariners (3) | 4–1 | Arncliffe Scots (-) |
| NSW | – | 22 | Padstow Hornets (-) | 1–11 | Bonnyrigg White Eagles (2) |
| NSW | – | 23 | Lane Cove (6) | 1–6 | Albion Park White Eagles (6) |
| NSW | – | 24 | North Epping Rangers (6) | 3–1 | Kellyville Kolts (-) |
| NSW | – | 25 | Dulwich Hill (4) | 3–0 | Dee Why FC (-) |
| NSW | – | 26 | Minchinbury Jets (-) | 0–10 | Lokomotiv Cove (6) |
| NSW | – | 27 | Baulkham Hills (6) | 2–3 | Picton Rangers (6) |
| NSW | – | 28 | Wollongong Wolves (2) | 0–3 | Sutherland Sharks (2) |
| NSW | – | 29 | St Augustine's FC (6) | 0–9 | Manly United (2) |
| NSW | – | 30 | Gosford City (6) | 2–4 | Kemblawarra Fury (6) |
| NSW | – | 31 | Bankstown Berries (3) | 2–0 | East Gosford (6) |
| NSW | – | 32 | Winston Hills (6) | 6–0 | Oatley FC (6) |
| NSW | – | 33 | Killarney District (6) | 3–2 | Blacktown Spartans (3) |
| NSW | – | 34 | Glenwood Redbacks (6) | 0–8 | Marconi Stallions (3) |
| NSW | – | 35 | Kirrawee Kangaroos (6) | 0–6 | Blacktown City (2) |
| NSW | – | 36 | APIA Leichhardt Tigers (2) | 3–0 | Leichhardt Saints (SPL) (6) |
| NSW | – | 37 | Macarthur Rams (3) | 2–2† | Bulli FC (6) |
Bulli FC advance 5–4 on penalties.
| NSW | – | 38 | Waverley Old Boys (6) | 2–1 | Gladesville Ravens (6) |
| NSW | – | 39 | Doonside Hawks (6) | 2–4 | Wollongong United (6) |
| NSW | – | 40 | West Pennant Hills Cherrybrook (6) | 0–6 | St George City (4) |
| NSW | – | 41 | Bankstown City (3) | 1–2 | Dunbar Rovers (4) |
| NSW | – | 42 | Hawkesbury City (4) | 1–2 | Nepean FC (5) |
| NSW | – | 43 | Lake Albert (6) | 2–4 | University of NSW (5) |
| NSW | – | 44 | Glebe Gorillas (6) | 1–6 | Hills Brumbies (3) |
| NSW | – | 45 | Lilli Pilli (6) | 1–4 | Granville Rage (4) |
| NSW | – | 46 | Quakers Hill JSC (6) | 0–8 | Southern Raiders (4) |
| NSW | – | 47 | Parramatta FC (2) | 4–1 | Bankstown United (5) |
| NSW | – | 48 | Mt Druitt Town Rangers (3) | 2–0 | Prospect United (5) |
Northern New South Wales
| NNSW | NTH | 49 | Coffs Coast Tigers (4) | 2–0 | Macleay Valley Rangers (4) |
| NNSW | NTH | 50 | Demon Knights (4) | 0–4 | Byron Bay Rams (4) |
| NNSW | NTH | 51 | Bangalow SC (4) | 3–1 | Oxley Vale Attunga (4) |
| NNSW | NTH | 52 | Taree Wildcats (4) | 1–7 | Coffs City United (4) |
| NNSW | STH | 53 | Warners Bay (5) | 1–8 | Maitland FC (2) |
| NNSW | STH | 54 | Edgeworth Eagles (2) | 9–0 | Belmont Swansea United (3) |
| NNSW | STH | 55 | Cessnock City Hornets (3) | 0–5 | Hamilton Olympic (2) |
| NNSW | STH | 56 | Broadmeadow Magic (2) | 8–0 | Wallsend FC (3) |
| NNSW | STH | 57 | Weston Workers Bears (2) | 1–0 | Cooks Hill United (3) |
| NNSW | STH | 58 | Mayfield United Senior (4) | 0–5 | Newcastle Suns (4) |
| NNSW | STH | 59 | Adamstown Rosebud (2) | 3–0 | Thornton Redbacks (3) |
| NNSW | STH | 60 | New Lambton (3) | 2–1 | Kahibah FC (3) |
| NNSW | STH | 61 | Charlestown City Blues (2) | 0–3 | Lambton Jaffas (2) |
| NNSW | STH | 62 | Singleton Strikers (3) | 1–5 | Lake Macquarie (2) |
| NNSW | STH | 63 | Dudley Redhead Senior (7) | 0–0† | Cardiff City (4) |
Cardiff City advance 5–4 on penalties.
Northern Territory
| NT | DAR | 64 | Darwin Olympic (2) | 2–4 | Hellenic AC (2) |
| NT | DAR | 65 | Darwin Rovers (2) | 1–0 | Casuarina FC (2) |
| NT | DAR | 66 | Mindil Aces (2) | 4–0 | Litchfield FC (3) |
Queensland
| QLD | BNE | 67 | Logan Lightning (3) | 4–1 | Capalaba FC (3) |
| QLD | BNE | 68 | Mitchelton FC (3) | 1–1† | Brisbane Knights (4) |
Brisbane Knights advance 4–1 on penalties.
| QLD | BNE | 69 | Toowong FC (5) | 1–2 | Albany Creek (3) |
| QLD | BNE | 70 | Holland Park Hawks (3) | 8–1 | North Pine United (4) |
| QLD | BNE | 71 | Centenary Stormers (5) | 0–2 | Souths United (3) |
| QLD | BNE | 72 | Rochedale Rovers (3) | 1–0 | The Gap (4) |
| QLD | BNE | 73 | Taringa Rovers (4) | 1–3 | Grange Thistle (3) |
| QLD | BNE | 74 | University of Queensland (4) | 4–2 | Ipswich City (5) |
| QLD | BNE | 75 | WDSC Wolves (4) | 0–4 | Peninsula Power (3) |
| QLD | BNE | 76 | Southside Eagles (4) | 3–1 | Brisbane Force (5) |

| Fed | Zone | Tie no | Home team (Tier) | Score | Away team (Tier) |
|---|---|---|---|---|---|
| QLD | FNQ | 77 | Mareeba United (3) | 8–2 | Innisfail United (3) |
| QLD | NQ | 78 | MA Olympic (3) | 3–0 | Rebels Gunners (3) |
| QLD | CQ | 79 | Emerald Eagles (3) | 1–21 | Capricorn Coast (3) |
| QLD | CQ | 80 | Frenchville FC (3) | 0–2 | Clinton FC (3) |
| QLD | MRF | 81 | Mackay Magpies (3) | 6–1 | Mackay Lions (3) |
| QLD | MRF | 82 | Mackay Wanderers (3) | 2–1 | Mackay City Brothers (3) |
| QLD | SC | 83 | Caloundra (3) | 2–2† | Woombye (3) |
Caloundra advance 4–2 on penalties.
| QLD | WB | 84 | Across The Waves (3) | 2–4 | Brothers Aston Villa (3) |
| QLD | WB | 85 | Doon Villa (3) | 4–4† | United Warriors (3) |
Doon Villa advance 4–2 on penalties.
| QLD | GC | 86 | Gold Coast Knights (3) | 3–1 | Surfers Paradise Apollo (3) |
| QLD | SWQ | 87 | University of Southern Queensland (3) | 2–0 | Gatton FC (3) |
South Australia
| SA | – | 88 | Adelaide Comets (2) | 2–3 | Croydon Kings (2) |
| SA | – | 89 | West Torrens Birkalla (2) | 3–1 | Western Strikers (3) |
| SA | – | 90 | Campbelltown City (2) | 1–0 | West Adelaide (2) |
| SA | – | 91 | Cumberland United (2) | 1–5 | North Eastern MetroStars (2) |
| SA | – | 92 | Adelaide University (4) | 2–3 | Gawler SC (4) |
| SA | – | 93 | Adelaide Blue Eagles (2) | 3–1 | Modbury Jets (3) |
| SA | – | 94 | Adelaide City (2) | 4–0 | White City (3) |
| SA | – | 95 | Adelaide Victory (3) | 1–2 | Para Hills Knights (2) |
Tasmania
| TAS | – | 96 | Clarence United (2) | 3–0 | Somerset FC (3) |
| TAS | – | 97 | Beachside FC (3) | 1–3 | Hobart Zebras (2) |
| TAS | – | 98 | Launceston United (3) | 0–12 | South Hobart (2) |
| TAS | – | 99 | Hobart United (3) | 0–6 | Devonport City (2) |
| TAS | – | 100 | Glenorchy Knights (3) | 1–0 | Kingborough Lions United (2) |
| TAS | – | 101 | Northern Rangers (2) | 0–1 | Nelson Eastern Suburbs (3) |
| TAS | – | 102 | University of Tasmania (3) | 2–3 | Launceston City (2) |
| TAS | – | 103 | Ulverstone FC (3) | 0–7 | Olympia FC (2) |
Victoria
| VIC | – | 104 | Corio SC (5) | 1–5 | Box Hill United (3) |
| VIC | – | 105 | Yarraville (4) | 3–3† | Hume United (5) |
Hume United advance 7–6 on penalties.
| VIC | – | 106 | Essendon United (5) | 3–1 | Cairnlea FC (5) |
| VIC | – | 107 | Hoppers Crossing (5) | 1–3 | Dandenong City (3) |
| VIC | – | 108 | Langwarrin SC (4) | 0–8 | Hume City (2) |
| VIC | – | 109 | Sunbury United (6) | 1–2 | Mooroolbark SC (4) |
| VIC | – | 110 | Warragul United (4) | 1–3 | South Springvale (4) |
| VIC | – | 111 | Brunswick City (3) | 0–4 | Oakleigh Cannons (2) |
| VIC | – | 112 | Knox City (6) | 1–0 | Pascoe Vale (2) |
| VIC | – | 113 | Springvale White Eagles (3) | 1–2 | Green Gully (2) |
| VIC | – | 114 | Westgate FC (4) | 0–6 | Western Suburbs (4) |
| VIC | – | 115 | Moreland City (3) | 3–1 | St Albans Saints (2) |
| VIC | – | 116 | Boroondara Eagles Carey (7) | 1–5 | North Sunshine Eagles (4) |
| VIC | – | 117 | Mornington SC (4) | 1–2 | Morwell Pegasus (4) |
| VIC | – | 118 | Bulleen Lions (2) | 4–1 | Manningham United (4) |
| VIC | – | 119 | Northcote City (3) | 4–3† | North Geelong Warriors (2) |
| VIC | – | 120 | Mill Park (7) | 1–4 | Monbulk Rangers (6) |
| VIC | – | 121 | St Kilda SC (4) | 1–3 | Richmond SC (3) |
| VIC | – | 122 | Altona City (5) | 4–0 | RMIT FC (7) |
Altona City removed from competition for fielding ineligible players.
| VIC | – | 123 | Sunshine George Cross (3) | 0–0† | Avondale FC (2) |
Avondale FC advance 4–3 on penalties.
| VIC | – | 124 | Banyule City (4) | 2–1 | Whittlesea Ranges (3) |
| VIC | – | 125 | South Melbourne (2) | 2–0 | Eastern Lions (3) |
| VIC | – | 126 | Ballarat City (3) | 0–2 | Werribee City (3) |
| VIC | – | 127 | Bendigo City (3) | 0–3 | Altona Magic (4) |
| VIC | – | 128 | Casey Comets (4) | 0–4 | Nunawading City (3) |
| VIC | – | 129 | Goulburn Valley Suns (3) | 0–1 | North Caulfield (5) |
| VIC | – | 130 | Heidelberg United (2) | 4–0 | Moreland Zebras (3) |
| VIC | – | 131 | Preston Lions (4) | 4–0 | Altona East Phoenix (4) |
| VIC | – | 132 | Port Melbourne (2) | 3–1 | Eltham Redbacks (5) |
| VIC | – | 133 | Geelong SC (4) | 1–3 | Melbourne Knights (2) |
| VIC | – | 134 | Bentleigh Greens (2) | 2–0† | Dandenong Thunder (3) |
| VIC | – | 135 | Murray United (3) | 1–4 | Kingston City (2) |
Western Australia
| WA | – | 136 | Wembley Downs (5) | 2–0 | Stirling Lions (2) |
| WA | – | 137 | Gwelup Croatia (4) | 2–1 | Balcatta SC (2) |
| WA | – | 138 | Perth SC (2) | 1–0 | Inglewood United (2) |
| WA | – | 139 | ECU Joondalup (2) | 3–1 | Morley-Windmills (4) |
| WA | – | 140 | Bayswater City (2) | 4–0 | Floreat Athena (2) |
| WA | – | 141 | Forrestfield United (3) | 1–2 | Dianella White Eagles (3) |
| WA | – | 142 | Fremantle City (3) | 0–2 | Mandurah City (2) |
| WA | – | 143 | Melville City (4) | 1–3 | South West Phoenix (3) |
| WA | – | 144 | Western Knights (3) | 14–0 | Busselton SC (-) |
| WA | – | 145 | Joondalup United (2) | 5–2 | Kingsley SC (5) |
| WA | – | 146 | Subiaco AFC (2) | 3–4 | UWA-Nedlands (3) |
| WA | – | 147 | Swan United (4) | 1–2 | Cockburn City (2) |
| WA | – | 148 | Kalamunda United (13) | 0–11 | Armadale (2) |
| WA | – | 149 | Sorrento FC (2) | 10–0 | Woodvale FC (9) |
| WA | – | 150 | Boulder City (-) | w/o | Joondalup City (4) |
| WA | – | 151 | Wanneroo City (4) | 2–0 | Southern Spirit (5) |

Notes

- w/o = Walkover
- † = After Extra Time
- NNSW Bye – Valentine Phoenix (2).

== Fifth round ==
| Fed | Zone | Tie no | Home team (Tier) | Score | Away team (Tier) |
Australian Capital Territory
| ACT | – | 1 | Canberra Olympic (2) | 3–0 | Woden Weston (2) |
| ACT | – | 2 | Gungahlin United (2) | 1–4 | Monaro Panthers (2) |
| ACT | – | 3 | Tuggeranong United (2) | 8–2 | Riverina Rhinos (2) |
| ACT | – | 4 | Canberra FC (2) | 3–1 | Tigers FC (2) |
New South Wales
| NSW | – | 5 | Waverley Old Boys (6) | 1–4 | Albion Park White Eagles (6) |
| NSW | – | 6 | Sutherland Sharks (2) | 1–4 | Fraser Park (4) |
| NSW | – | 7 | Killarney District (6) | 0–4 | APIA Leichhardt Tigers (2) |
| NSW | – | 8 | Marconi Stallions (3) | 8–0 | Wagga City Wanderers (5) |
| NSW | – | 9 | Bonnyrigg White Eagles (2) | 4–0 | Northern Tigers (3) |
| NSW | – | 10 | Blacktown City (2) | 2–0 | Lokomotiv Cove (6) |
| NSW | – | 11 | Mounties Wanderers (3) | 6–0 | Dunbar Rovers (ESFA) (6) |
| NSW | – | 12 | Dulwich Hill (4) | 3–0 | Winston Hills (6) |
| NSW | – | 13 | Hakoah Sydney City East (2) | 1–1† | Manly United (2) |
Hakoah Sydney City East advance 4–2 on penalties.
| NSW | – | 14 | Southern Raiders (4) | 3–2 | St George (3) |
| NSW | – | 15 | Parramatta FC (2) | 3–0 | Southern and Ettalong United (6) |
| NSW | – | 16 | Picton Rangers (6) | 0–3 | Sydney Olympic (2) |
| NSW | – | 17 | Western NSW Mariners (4) | 0–4 | Rockdale City Suns (2) |
| NSW | – | 18 | St George City (4) | 2–8 | Hills Brumbies (3) |
| NSW | – | 19 | Kemblawarra Fury (6) | 5–2 | Camden Tigers (5) |
| NSW | – | 20 | Dunbar Rovers (4) | 0–2 | Bankstown Berries (3) |
| NSW | – | 21 | North Epping Rangers (6) | 1–4 | Bulli FC (6) |
| NSW | – | 22 | North Shore Mariners (3) | 1–6 | Nepean FC (5) |
| NSW | – | 23 | Mt Druitt Town Rangers (3) | 3–1 | University of NSW (5) |
| NSW | – | 24 | Granville Rage (4) | 1–3 | Wollongong United (6) |
Northern New South Wales
| NNSW | NTH | 25 | Coffs Coast Tigers (4) | 1–5 | Byron Bay Rams (4) |
| NNSW | NTH | 26 | Coffs City United (4) | 3–0 | Bangalow SC (4) |
| NNSW | STH | 27 | Lake Macquarie (2) | 1–2 | Cardiff City (4) |
| NNSW | STH | 28 | Lambton Jaffas (2) | 1–0 | Adamstown Rosebud (2) |
| NNSW | STH | 29 | New Lambton (3) | 0–3 | Broadmeadow Magic (2) |
| NNSW | STH | 30 | Maitland FC (2) | 3–2 | Weston Workers Bears (2) |
| NNSW | STH | 31 | Hamilton Olympic (2) | 2–4 | Edgeworth Eagles (2) |
| NNSW | STH | 32 | Newcastle Suns (4) | 2–4 | Valentine Phoenix (2) |
Northern Territory
| NT | DAR | 33 | Hellenic AC (2) | 0–1 | Darwin Rovers (2) |
| NT | ASP | 34 | Alice Springs Vikings (2) | 3–4 | Gillen Scorpions (2) |
| NT | ASP | 35 | Alice Springs Celtic (2) | 5–2 | Alice Springs Stormbirds (2) |
Queensland
| QLD | BNE | 36 | Rochedale Rovers (3) | 3–1 | Brisbane Strikers (2) |
| QLD | BNE | 37 | Souths United (3) | 2–2† | Holland Park Hawks (3) |
Holland Park Hawks advance 5–3 on penalties.
| QLD | BNE | 38 | Albany Creek (3) | 1–2 | Moreton Bay United (2) |
| QLD | BNE | 39 | Southside Eagles (4) | 0–2 | Grange Thistle (3) |
| QLD | BNE | 40 | Western Pride (2) | 1–2 | Olympic FC (2) |
| QLD | BNE | 41 | Brisbane Knights (4) | 0–5 | Peninsula Power (3) |

| Fed | Zone | Tie no | Home team (Tier) | Score | Away team (Tier) |
|---|---|---|---|---|---|
| QLD | BNE | 42 | Brisbane City (2) | 2–3 | Logan Lightning (3) |
| QLD | BNE | 43 | University of Queensland (4) | 0–2 | Redlands United (2) |
| QLD | FNQ | 44 | Mareeba United (3) | 1–4 | Far North Queensland (2) |
| QLD | NQ | 45 | MA Olympic (3) | 1–3 | Northern Fury (2) |
| QLD | CQ | 46 | Capricorn Coast (3) | 2–1 | Clinton FC (3) |
| QLD | MRF | 47 | Mackay Magpies (3) | 10–1 | Mackay Wanderers (3) |
| QLD | SC | 48 | Caloundra (3) | 4–3 | Sunshine Coast (2) |
| QLD | WB | 49 | Brothers Aston Villa (3) | 8–0 | Doon Villa (3) |
| QLD | GC | 50 | Gold Coast Knights (3) | 0–1 | Gold Coast City (2) |
| QLD | SWQ | 51 | South West Queensland Thunder (2) | 3–0 | University of Southern Queensland (3) |
South Australia
| SA | – | 52 | North Eastern MetroStars (2) | 4–2 | Croydon Kings (2) |
| SA | – | 53 | Adelaide Blue Eagles (2) | 7–0 | Gawler SC (4) |
| SA | – | 54 | West Torrens Birkalla (2) | 2–0 | Para Hills Knights (2) |
| SA | – | 55 | Campbelltown City (2) | 1–2 | Adelaide City (2) |
Tasmania
| TAS | – | 56 | Hobart Zebras (2) | 6–0 | Clarence United (2) |
| TAS | – | 57 | Launceston City (2) | 2–1 | South Hobart (2) |
| TAS | – | 58 | Glenorchy Knights (3) | 2–2† | Devonport City (2) |
Glenorchy Knights advance 4–3 on penalties.
| TAS | – | 59 | Olympia FC (2) | 12–0 | Nelson Eastern Suburbs (3) |
Victoria
| VIC | – | 60 | South Melbourne (2) | 4–0 | Monbulk Rangers (6) |
| VIC | – | 61 | Western Suburbs (4) | 1–2 | Oakleigh Cannons (2) |
| VIC | – | 62 | Hume United (5) | 0–1 | Moreland City (3) |
| VIC | – | 63 | Richmond SC (3) | 0–6 | Bentleigh Greens (2) |
| VIC | – | 64 | Heidelberg United (2) | 6–1 | Knox City (6) |
| VIC | – | 65 | Hume City (2) | 3–0 | Nunawading City (3) |
| VIC | – | 66 | Essendon United (5) | 0–1 | Avondale FC (2) |
| VIC | – | 67 | Box Hill United (3) | 3–2 | South Springvale (4) |
| VIC | – | 68 | Kingston City (2) | 6–0 | North Caulfield (5) |
| VIC | – | 69 | Banyule City (4) | 1–3† | Melbourne Knights (2) |
| VIC | – | 70 | RMIT FC (7) | 0–1 | Morwell Pegasus (4) |
| VIC | – | 71 | Dandenong City (3) | 2–0 | Bulleen Lions (2) |
| VIC | – | 72 | Green Gully (2) | 4–0 | Altona Magic (4) |
| VIC | – | 73 | North Sunshine Eagles (4) | 4–4† | Preston Lions (4) |
North Sunshine Eagles advance 4–2 on penalties.
| VIC | – | 74 | Werribee City (3) | 1–4 | Port Melbourne (2) |
| VIC | – | 75 | Mooroolbark SC (4) | 1–3 | Northcote City (3) |
Western Australia
| WA | – | 76 | Wanneroo City (4) | w/o | Boulder City (-) |
| WA | – | 77 | Sorrento FC (2) | 3–1 | UWA-Nedlands (3) |
| WA | – | 78 | Cockburn City (2) | 3–2 | South West Phoenix (3) |
| WA | – | 79 | Gwelup Croatia (4) | 5–1 | Mandurah City (2) |
| WA | – | 80 | Armadale (2) | 0–5 | Bayswater City (2) |
| WA | – | 81 | ECU Joondalup (2) | 1–3 | Dianella White Eagles (3) |
| WA | – | 82 | Western Knights (3) | 3–0 | Wembley Downs (5) |
| WA | – | 83 | Joondalup United (2) | 0–2 | Perth SC (2) |

Notes

- w/o = Walkover
- † = After Extra Time
- NT Bye – Mindil Aces (2)

== Sixth round ==
| Fed | Zone | Tie no | Home team (Tier) | Score | Away team (Tier) |
Australian Capital Territory
| ACT | – | 1 | Canberra FC (2) | 1–3 | Canberra Olympic (2) |
| ACT | – | 2 | Monaro Panthers (2) | 1–3 | Tuggeranong United (2) |
New South Wales
| NSW | – | 3 | Bonnyrigg White Eagles (2) | 0–2 | APIA Leichhardt Tigers (2) |
| NSW | – | 4 | Kemblawarra Fury (6) | 2–1 | Fraser Park (4) |
| NSW | – | 5 | Wollongong United (6) | 3–6 | Hills Brumbies (3) |
| NSW | – | 6 | Blacktown City (2) | 2–1† | Mt Druitt Town Rangers (3) |
| NSW | – | 7 | Nepean FC (5) | 1–2† | Bulli FC (6) |
| NSW | – | 8 | Dulwich Hill (4) | 1–2 | Bankstown Berries (3) |
| NSW | – | 9 | Rockdale City Suns (2) | 4–2 | Marconi Stallions (3) |
| NSW | – | 10 | Hakoah Sydney City East (2) | 3–3† | Albion Park White Eagles (6) |
Hakoah Sydney City advance 4–2 on penalties.
| NSW | – | 11 | Sydney Olympic (2) | 2–1 | Parramatta FC (2) |
| NSW | – | 12 | Southern Raiders (4) | 3–1 | Mounties Wanderers (3) |
Northern New South Wales
| NNSW | NTH v STH | 13 | Byron Bay Rams (4) | 2–3† | Maitland FC (2) |
| NNSW | NTH v STH | 14 | Coffs City United (4) | 1–1† | Cardiff City (4) |
Coffs City United advance 4–2 on penalties.
| NNSW | STH | 15 | Lambton Jaffas (2) | 0–5 | Edgeworth Eagles (2) |
| NNSW | STH | 16 | Valentine Phoenix (2) | 0–4 | Broadmeadow Magic (2) |
Northern Territory
| NT | DAR | 17 | Mindil Aces (2) | 2–3 | Darwin Rovers (2) |
| NT | ASP | 18 | Alice Springs Celtic (2) | 0–0† | Gillen Scorpions (2) |
Alice Springs Celtic advance 3–2 on penalties.
Queensland
| QLD | BNE | 19 | Redlands United (2) | 1–4 | Olympic FC (2) |
| QLD | BNE | 20 | Peninsula Power (3) | 2–2† | Logan Lightning (3) |
Peninsula Power advance 7–6 on penalties.

| Fed | Zone | Tie no | Home team (Tier) | Score | Away team (Tier) |
|---|---|---|---|---|---|
| QLD | BNE | 21 | Grange Thistle (3) | 1–0 | Rochedale Rovers (3) |
| QLD | BNE | 22 | Holland Park Hawks (3) | 1–2† | Moreton Bay United (2) |
| QLD | FNQ v NQ | 23 | Far North Queensland (2) | 3–0 | Northern Fury (2) |
| QLD | CQ v MRF | 24 | Capricorn Coast (3) | 3–4 | Mackay Magpies (3) |
| QLD | WB v SC | 25 | Brothers Aston Villa (3) | 0–4 | Caloundra (3) |
| QLD | SWQ v GC | 26 | South West Queensland Thunder (2) | 0–4 | Gold Coast City (2) |
South Australia
| SA | – | 27 | West Torrens Birkalla (2) | 0–2 | North Eastern MetroStars (2) |
| SA | – | 28 | Adelaide Blue Eagles (2) | 1–5 | Adelaide City (2) |
Tasmania
| TAS | – | 29 | Olympia FC (2) | 2–0 | Hobart Zebras (2) |
| TAS | – | 30 | Glenorchy Knights (3) | 6–0 | Launceston City (2) |
Victoria
| VIC | – | 31 | Port Melbourne (2) | 2–2† | Northcote City (3) |
Northcote City advance 3–2 on penalties.
| VIC | – | 32 | Moreland City (3) | 4–2 | Oakleigh Cannons (2) |
| VIC | – | 33 | Dandenong City (3) | 3–2 | Melbourne Knights (2) |
| VIC | – | 34 | Avondale FC (2) | 0–1 | Green Gully (2) |
| VIC | – | 35 | Heidelberg United (2) | 3–1 | Kingston City (2) |
| VIC | – | 36 | South Melbourne (2) | 2–1 | Box Hill United (3) |
| VIC | – | 37 | Bentleigh Greens (2) | 6–0 | Morwell Pegasus (4) |
| VIC | – | 38 | North Sunshine Eagles (4) | 0–5 | Hume City (2) |
Western Australia
| WA | – | 39 | Cockburn City (2) | 0–3 | Dianella White Eagles (3) |
| WA | – | 40 | Western Knights (3) | 3–1 | Perth SC (2) |
| WA | – | 41 | Wanneroo City (4) | 0–2 | Sorrento FC (2) |
| WA | – | 42 | Bayswater City (2) | 6–0 | Gwelup Croatia (4) |

Notes

- † = After Extra Time

== Seventh round ==
| Fed | Zone | Tie no | Home team (Tier) | Score | Away team (Tier) |
Australian Capital Territory
| ACT | – | 1 | Canberra Olympic (2) | 2–0 | Tuggeranong United (2) |
New South Wales
| NSW | – | 2 | Bulli FC (6) | 0–3 | Blacktown City (2) |
| NSW | – | 3 | Rockdale City Suns (2) | 1–3 | Hakoah Sydney City East (2) |
| NSW | – | 4 | Bankstown Berries (3) | 1–0 | Sydney Olympic (2) |
| NSW | – | 5 | APIA Leichhardt Tigers (2) | 2–1† | Southern Raiders (4) |
| NSW | – | 6 | Hills Brumbies (3) | 5–2 | Kemblawarra Fury (6) |
Northern New South Wales
| NNSW | – | 7 | Broadmeadow Magic (2) | 3–1 | Coffs City United (4) |
| NNSW | – | 8 | Edgeworth FC (2) | 1–0 | Maitland FC (2) |
Northern Territory
| NT | DAR v ASP | 9 | Darwin Rovers (2) | 2–0 | Alice Springs Celtic (2) |
Queensland
| QLD | BNE | 10 | Grange Thistle (3) | 0–3 | Peninsula Power (3) |

| Fed | Zone | Tie no | Home team (Tier) | Score | Away team (Tier) |
|---|---|---|---|---|---|
| QLD | BNE | 11 | Olympic FC (2) | 2–4 | Moreton Bay United (2) |
| QLD | NQL | 12 | Far North Queensland (2) | 6–1 | Mackay Magpies (3) |
| QLD | SQL | 13 | Gold Coast City (2) | 5–1 | Caloundra (3) |
South Australia
| SA | – | 14 | North Eastern MetroStars (2) | 2–0 | Adelaide City (2) |
Tasmania
| TAS | – | 15 | Olympia FC (2) | 4–2 | Glenorchy Knights (3) |
Victoria
| VIC | – | 16 | Bentleigh Greens (2) | 3–2 | Green Gully (2) |
| VIC | – | 17 | Northcote City (3) | 0–2 | Heidelberg United (2) |
| VIC | – | 18 | South Melbourne (2) | 5–4 | Dandenong City (3) |
| VIC | – | 19 | Hume City (2) | 4–0 | Moreland City (3) |
Western Australia
| WA | – | 20 | Bayswater City (2) | 1–2 | Western Knights (3) |
| WA | – | 21 | Sorrento FC (2) | 1–0 | Dianella White Eagles (3) |

Notes

- † = After Extra Time
