= Newmarket SFC =

Newmarket
- Full name: Newmarket Soccer Football Club
- Nickname: Newy
- Short name: Market
- Founded: 1949
- Ground: McCook Park, Newmarket
- Chairman: Paul Tatters
- Coach: Josh Hempstead
- League: FQPL 3 – Metro
- 2025: 2nd of 13 (champions)
- Website: http://www.newmarketsoccerclub.com.au/

Newmarket Soccer Football Club is an Australian football (soccer) club based at Newmarket, an inner north-west suburb of Brisbane, Queensland. The club was founded in 1949 as the Postal Institute Soccer Club, adopting its current name in the mid-1960s. The men's senior team currently competes in Football Queensland's Premier League 3 – Metro. Newmarket SFC play in a gold strip (home) and a maroon strip (away). The club's logo has remained the same since foundation and depicts the Greek God Hermes, the patron and protector of athletes and messenger of the gods.

== History ==
The Postal Institute Soccer Club was founded in 1949 and initially based on the southside of Brisbane. The decision to form the club occurred towards the end of 1948 and occurred under the guidance of Henry Seeney and Les Tozer, members of the Postal Institute who had played for the Latrobe and Toombul clubs respectively. The club was placed in Division Five, and lost their first competitive match 5–2 to Mitchelton's reserve team on 2 April 1949. It remained in the lower divisions until winning its first title by topping the Division Four table in 1953. A further promotion saw the club reach Division Two in 1958, where the club remained for seven seasons until it was relegated at the end of the 1964 season.

The club returned to Division Two as the Newmarket Soccer Football Club in 1967, and alternated between Division Two and Three several times during the next ten seasons. Newmarket finished Division Two in fourth place for three consecutive seasons (1979 to 1981) before achieving promotion to Division One in 1982. The 1983 season witnessed Newmarket's best league performance, finishing second in Division One but denied the second promotion spot to the Brisbane Premier League which instead went to third placed Coalstars. From 1983 to 2015, Newmarket completed 33 seasons in either the second or third tier of the Brisbane football structure, during which the highlights included Division Three Grand Final victories in 1993 and 1996.

In 2005, Newmarket achieved their best cup performance, reaching the quarter-finals of the 2005 Brisbane Premier Cup, the only time the club has progressed this far in cup competition.

Between 2011 and 2013 the club lost access to its clubhouse through insect damage which required assistance from the Brisbane City Council to rectify, and resulted in a drop in activity at the club with participation falling from 30 junior teams in 2011 to 17 teams in 2013.

Newmarket SFC was relegated from Capital League 2 in 2015 after losing their final three games, which allowed Slacks Creek and Pine Hills to overtake them in the final three weeks of the season. Newmarket spent two seasons in Capital League 3, finishing sixth on both occasions; however, due to a restructuring of the league at the end of the 2017 season, they were promoted back to Capital League 2.

Season	League											FFA Cup
Season	Division (tier)	Pld	W	D	L	GF	GA	GD	Pts	Position	Finals Series	FFA Cup
2008	Premier Division 2 (5)	22	8	1	13	41	46	−5	25	6th	DNQ	Not yet founded
2009	Premier Division 2 (5)	22	11	3	8	47	35	12	36	3rd	Semi-final	Not yet founded
2010	Premier Division 2 (5)	22	10	4	8	51	42	9	34	6th	DNQ	Not yet founded
2011	Premier Division 2 (5)	26	11	7	8	56	35	21	37	8th	DNQ	Not yet founded
2012	Premier Division 2 (5)	22	8	3	11	36	42	−6	27	8th	DNQ	Not yet founded
2013	Capital League 2 (5)	22	6	3	13	30	59	−29	21	9th	DNQ	Not yet founded
2014	Capital League 2 (5)	22	14	2	6	67	36	31	44	3rd	Semi-final	Qualifying Round
2015	Capital League 2 (5)	22	6	3	13	29	57	−28	21	11th ↓	DNQ	Preliminary Round 3
2016	Capital League 3 (6)	22	8	4	10	37	38	−1	28	6th	DNQ	Preliminary Round 2
2017	Capital League 3 (6)	22	9	4	9	31	41	−10	31	6th	DNQ	Preliminary Round 2

Key:	Premiers / Champions	Promoted ↑	Relegated ↓

The tier is the level in the Australian soccer league system

== Honours ==
=== Football Queensland ===
- Queensland Premier League 3 – Metro – Champions (2) 2024, 2025

=== Football Brisbane ===
- Brisbane Division 4 – Premiers 1953
- Brisbane Division 2 – Premiers 1982
- Brisbane Division 3 – Premiers and Champions 1993
- Brisbane Division 3 – Champions 1996

== Notable past players ==
- Michael McGowan
- Michael Baird
- Raymond Attard
- Henry Faleye
- Shaun Dunleavy
- Nathan Minter
- Robert Ward
- Matthew Mcdonnell
