= Virginia United FC (Australia) =

- Full name: Virginia United Football Club
- Founded: 1970
- Ground: Albert Bishop Park, Nundah
- League: Men: FQPL2 Women: FQPL1
- 2026: Men:9th Women: 8th
- Website: http://www.virginiaunitedfc.com.au/

Virginia United FC is an Australian football (soccer) club located in Nundah. It was originally based in the nearby suburb of Virginia from which the club gets its name. Virginia United has existed since 1970 and serves as the local club for Nundah and its surrounding suburbs. After achieving promotion from Capital League 2 in 2017, the club will compete in the Brisbane Premier League in 2018 for the first time in its history. The club currently plays in the Football Queensland Premier League 2.

== History ==
Virginia United FC was established in 1970 and originally played at the ARC Hill Park in Goss Road, Virginia.

The club first fielded a senior men’s team in Brisbane competition in 1979, joining the league in Division Five for that season. After winning the 1982 Division Four grand final and the 1983 Division Three premiership, the club reached Division Two in 1984. Virginia United’s next success was winning the 1990 Division Five premiership and grand final double. They went on to win the 1993 Division Four premiership before their senior side went into recess after the 1994 season.

Virginia United’s senior men’s team re-emerged in 2008 and competed in the Metro League until the reorganisation of the Football Brisbane structure in 2013 which resulted in the club being placed in Capital League 3 for that season. After finishing mid-table for a couple of seasons, Virginia United finished top of the Capital League 3 table in 2016 and also won the grand final on penalties against Toowong.

Further success followed in 2017 with Virginia United claiming second spot in the Capital League 2 table to win promotion to the Brisbane Premier League for the first time in the club’s history. The club were also crowned 2017 champions, beating the premiers Centenary Stormers 2-1 in the grand final.

Following their successful 2017 season, Virginia United entered the Brisbane Premier League in 2018 for the first time in their history. The step up proved challenging, and the club finished 12th in a competitive 22-game campaign. In 2019, Virginia United were competing in Capital League 1, where they recorded a 10th-place finish. The 2020 season, shortened due to COVID-19, again saw the club in Capital League 1, finishing 8th after a condensed fixture list.

In 2021, Virginia United joined the newly restructured Football Queensland Premier League 2 (FQPL2). Their first season in the division was steady, ending in 7th position. The following year, however, proved difficult, with the team finishing 12th in 2022, resulting in relegation to FQPL3.

The club rebounded strongly in 2023. After finishing the regular season in 3rd place, Virginia United went on a memorable finals run and claimed the FQPL3 Grand Final, defeating Bayside United in a dramatic penalty shootout after a 2–2 draw. In 2024, the team again finished 3rd in FQPL3 and progressed to the semi-finals, continuing to show stability and competitiveness. By 2025, the club had secured promotion and was preparing to return to FQPL2 for the 2026 season.

Virginia United’s women’s program also continued to grow during this period. The senior women's side competed in FQPL1 Women, finishing 4th in 2023 and 6th in 2024. The club invested heavily in its female pathways, culminating in the girls’ academy teams competing in FQ Academy League 1 (FQA1) — the highest tier for girls’ development in Queensland by 2025.

Off the field, the club earned notable recognition, including being named Football Brisbane Club of the Year in 2019, highlighting its strong community engagement, development programs, and growing academy structure. The club’s youth programs continued to evolve, with the FQ Academy (U13–U18) progressing from bronze to silver tier after 2021 and maintaining strong participation across both boys’ and girls’ age groups.

== Recent seasons ==
=== Senior Men ===
Season	League											FFA Cup
Season	Division (tier)	Pld	W	D	L	GF	GA	GD	Pts	Position	Finals Series	FFA Cup
2008	Metro League 5 Blue (10)	22	10	3	9	58	44	14	33	6th ↑	DNQ	Not yet founded
2009	Metro League 4 Blue (9)	21	12	4	5	73	44	29	40	3rd ↑	Semi Final	Not yet founded
2010	Metro League 3 Blue (8)	20	8	2	10	48	42	6	26	8th ↑	DNQ	Not yet founded
2011	Metro League 2 (7)	22	4	2	16	35	99	-64	14	11th ↑	DNQ	Not yet founded
2012	Metro League 1 (6)	22	8	2	12	45	61	-16	26	7th	DNQ	Not yet founded
2013	Capital League 3 (6)	20	5	2	13	25	57	-32	17	9th	DNQ	Not yet founded
2014	Capital League 3 (6)	22	9	3	10	46	39	7	30	6th	DNQ	Preliminary Round 3
2015	Capital League 3 (6)	22	10	3	9	46	40	6	33	6th	DNQ	Preliminary Round 4
2016	Capital League 3 (6)	22	17	3	2	67	23	44	54	1st ↑	Champions	Preliminary Round 4
2017	Capital League 2 (5)	22	17	1	4	66	19	47	52	2nd ↑	Champions	Preliminary Round 3
2018	Brisbane Premier League (4)	22	2	6	14	27	58	-31	12	8th	DNQ	Preliminary Round 4
2019	Capital League 1 (6)	22	7	2	13	39	48	-9	23	10th	DNQ	Preliminary Round 2
2020	Capital League 1 (6)	16	7	2	7	36	33	3	23	8th	DNQ	
2021	Football Queensland Premier League 2 (3)	21	6	3	12	43	70	-27	21	7th		Preliminary Round 3
2022	Football Queensland Premier League 2 (3)	22	3	3	16	47	67	-20	12	12th	Relegation to FQPL 3	
2023	Football Queensland Premier League 3 (4)	22	13	3	6	59	44	15	42	3rd	Champions	
2024	Football Queensland Premier League 3 (4)	22	15	0	7	69	40	29	45	3rd	Semi-Finalists	
2025	Football Queensland Premier League 3 (4)										Promoted to FQPL 2	

Key:	Premiers / Champions	Promoted ↑	Relegated ↓

The tier is the level in the Australian soccer league system

=== Senior Women ===
Season	League										
Season	Division (tier)	Pld	W	D	L	GF	GA	GD	Pts	Position	Finals Series
2013	Womens City League 2 (5)	21	15	3	3	64	19	45	48	1st	Champions
2014	Womens City League 1 (4)	20	7	4	9	27	31	-4	25	7th	DNQ
2015	Womens City League 2 (5)	20	14	3	3	72	22	50	45	2nd	Runners Up
2016	Womens Capital League (4)	20	15	2	3	56	23	33	47	1st	Champions (penalty shoot-out)
2017	Brisbane Womens Premier League (3)	18	4	4	10	31	54	-23	16	8th	DNQ
2018	Brisbane Womens Premier League (3)	21	10	3	8	31	34	-3	33	4th	Semi-Finalists
2019	Brisbane Womens Premier League (3)	22	11	3	8	55	39	16	36	6th	
2020	Brisbane Womens Premier League (3)	15	8	2	5	35	21	14	26	3rd	N/A
2021											
2022	Football Queensland Premier League 1 (2)	21	10	4	7	35	30	5	34	4th	Semi-Finalists
2023	Football Queensland Premier League 1 (2)	21	10	1	10	38	54	-16	30	4th	Semi-Finalists
2024	Football Queensland Premier League 1 (2)	18	6	5	7	49	44	5	23	6th	N/A
2025	Football Queensland Premier League 1 (2)	18	7	1	10	25	31	-6	22	7th	N/A

== Honours ==
=== Senior men ===
- Brisbane Division 4 – Champions 1982
- Brisbane Division 3 – Premiers 1983
- Brisbane Division 5 – Premiers and champions 1990
- Brisbane Division 4 – Premiers 1993
- Capital League 3 – Premiers and champions 2016
- Capital League 2 – Champions 2017
- Football Queensland Premier League 3 – Metro – Premiers 2025

=== Senior women ===
- Capital League - Premiers and champions 2016
