= North Star FC =

North Star
- Full name: North Star Football Club
- Nickname: Stars
- Founded: 1958
- Ground: O'Callaghan Park
- President: George Stylinaou
- Coach: Mark Wills
- League: FQPL
- 2025: 2nd of 12 Queensland Premier League 2 (Promoted)
- Website: http://www.northstarfc.com.au/wspHome.aspx
Home colours	Away colours

North Star FC is a football (soccer) club formed in 1958 and based in Zillmere, Queensland, Australia.

== History ==
North Star FC was founded in 1958 as Zillmere Stars Junior Soccer Club by a group of local fathers after the Zillmere Church of Christ was unable to continue operating its football teams. The club began playing at O’Callaghan Park in Zillmere, where it remains based today. At the time, a separate men’s side known as the Zillmere Magpies operated independently from the newly formed junior club. In 1963, Zillmere Stars expanded to include a women’s team.

During the late 1970s and early 1980s, under the leadership of club president Laurie Anderson and senior football director Jack Baron, the club experienced significant growth and on-field success. North Star won Division 3 in 1980 and Division 2 in 1981, before establishing itself as a strong force in Brisbane Premier League football throughout the late 1980s and early 1990s.

The club enjoyed success across both junior and senior football during this period and was reportedly approached about joining the National Soccer League (NSL). However, financial difficulties during the mid-1990s saw the club return to amateur status and suffer relegation.

In 1996, the club was restructured following a business merger involving Brisbane Strikers FC. North Star later returned to the Brisbane Premier League in 2011 before competing in Brisbane Capital League 1 in subsequent seasons. In 2016, the club narrowly missed promotion back to the Brisbane Premier League, finishing one point short after leading the competition with two rounds remaining. The senior men’s side secured promotion to the Brisbane Premier League for the 2020 season after finishing runners-up in 2019.

In 2018, North Star FC was granted entry into the Women’s Capital League 1 competition for the 2019 season, with Kevin Gower appointed as the inaugural head coach. The women’s side finished fourth in its debut campaign.

In 2021, the club received a Football Queensland licence to compete in the newly established Football Queensland Premier League 2 (FQPL2). Gordon Tulloch was appointed Technical Director and later appointed Lee Cunningham as head coach. North Star finished fourth in its inaugural FQPL2 season.

In 2025, North Star FC achieved promotion from FQPL2 to FQPL1.

== Club honours ==
Brisbane Premier League

- Premiers:
  - 1986
  - 1989
  - 1992
  - 1994
- Champions (Grand Final winners):
  - 1988 (defeated Brisbane City 2–1 aet) Team: 1. Dave Gallagher, 2. Mark Greer, 3. Gordon Buchanan, 4. Billy Williamson (c), 5. Danny Lobwein, 6. Ross Swan, 8. Gerry Lindsay, 9. Paul Fagan, 10. Jim McDonagh, 11. Phil Mulvey, 12. Lee Scriggins, 13. Alan Hughes, 15. Ken Swan, 16. Justin Kilshaw, 20 Noel Lord. Coach: Iain Fagan. Scorers: J McDonagh, L Scriggins.
  - 1992 (defeated Rochedale Rovers 2–0)
  - 1994 (defeated Taringa Rovers 2–1 (replay after 1–1 draw))
- Grand Final Runner-up
  - 1986 (lost to Coalstars 1–2)

Brisbane Premier League Division 1

- Champions (Grand Final winners):
  - 2011

Ampol Cup

- Grand Final winners:
  - 1984 (defeated Lions 2–1)
  - 1985 (defeated Sunnyside United 5–0)
  - 1989
  - 1990
- Grand Final runners-up:
  - 1986 (lost to Coalstars 2–3)
  - 1988 (lost to Gold Coast 2–4 aet) Scorers: Billy Williamson pen, Gerry Lindsay.
- Star junior goal scorers:
  - Lemi Lasu (90 Goals in 5 seasons)
  - Cody Hassum (30 Goals in 2 seasons)
  - Maurece Jackson (70 goals in 3 seasons)

== Notable former players ==
- (England) Owen Purcell (Professional footballer for West Ham FC)
- (Australia) Mike Mulvey
- (Australia) Royce Brownlie
- (Australia) Craig Moore
- (England) Peter Clemitson
- (Scotland) Billy Williamson
- (Germany) Werner Friske
- (Japan) Rinichi Mikami
- (New Zealand) Alan Marley
- (Japan) Shuto Ogata
- (Japan) Shimon Watanabe
- (Australia) Daniel Leach
