= Centenary Stormers FC =

- Full name: Centenary Stormers Football Club
- Founded: 2000
- Ground: Atthows Park, Darra
- League: FQPL 3 – Metro
- 2025: 12th of 13, (Relegated); FQPL 4 – Metro
- Website: http://www.centenarystormers.com.au/

Centenary Stormers FC is an Australian football (soccer) club from Darra, a southwestern suburb of Brisbane. The club is a relative newcomer to the Brisbane football scene, having been formed in 2000. The club currently has a strong emphasis on the development of its junior players with a focus on the age groups running from Under 6s to Under 12s.

The club has participated in senior Football Brisbane competition since 2007 and is expected to compete in the Brisbane Premier League for the first time in 2018. The club currently plays in the Football Queensland Premier League 3 – Metro.

== History ==
Centenary Stormers Football Club was formed in 2000 and has been registered with Football Brisbane since the beginning of the 2000 season. The club first fielded a team in Football Brisbane competitions in 2007, starting in Metro League Division Five which was then the eighth tier of the FB structure. A second-place finish and Grand Final win the following season resulted in the club being promoted to Metro League Division Three.

Centenary Stormers then achieved a further four promotions between 2011 and 2015, rising four divisions from Metro League 3 Blue to Capital League 1. During this period the club formed a partnership with former national representative Craig Moore and Viva Soccer in late 2012 to run a pilot coaching program to set sporting standards by which a junior player's performance can be measured, managed and accredited, as part of its drive to support all junior players.

Centenary Stormers FC won its first premiership, finishing top of the table in Capital League 3 in 2014.

In 2016, Centenary Stormers was relegated for the first time in their history, appearing safe in Capital League 1 with three rounds to go, but then being overtaken by a late four match winning run by Mount Gravatt. Centenary Stormers bounced back by winning the 2017 Capital League 2 premiership and are expected to compete in the Brisbane Premier League for the first time in 2018 due to a restructure of senior men's competitions by Football Brisbane.

== Seasons ==
Season	League											FFA Cup
Season	Division (tier)	Pld	W	D	L	GF	GA	GD	Pts	Position	Finals Series	FFA Cup
2007	Metro League 5 (9)	20	2	1	17	22	80	-58	7	11th	DNQ	Not yet founded
2008	Metro League 5 Silver (10)	22	16	3	3	65	23	42	51	2nd ↑	Champions	Not yet founded
2009	Metro League 3 (8)	20	14	3	3	51	27	24	45	2nd	Semi Final	Not yet founded
2010	Metro League 3 Blue (8)	20	13	1	6	70	35	35	40	3rd	Semi Final	Not yet founded
2011	Metro League 3 Blue (8)	20	10	3	7	45	42	3	33	3rd ↑	Runners-up	Not yet founded
2012	Metro League 2 (7)	21	14	3	4	59	30	29	45	3rd ↑	Semi Final	Not yet founded
2013	Capital League 3 (6)	20	7	2	11	51	61	-10	23	7th	DNQ	Not yet founded
2014	Capital League 3 (6)	22	17	3	2	86	31	55	54	1st ↑	Preliminary Final	Preliminary Round 4
2015	Capital League 2 (5)	22	16	2	4	70	37	33	50	2nd ↑	Preliminary Final	Preliminary Round 5
2016	Capital League 1 (4)	22	4	5	13	38	62	-24	17	11th ↓	DNQ	Preliminary Round 4
2017	Capital League 2 (5)	22	18	2	2	77	26	51	56	1st ↑	Runners-up	Preliminary Round 4

Key:	Premiers / Champions	Promoted ↑	Relegated ↓

The tier is the level in the Australian soccer league system

== Honours ==
- Metro League 5 Silver – Champions 2008
- Capital League 3 – Premiers 2014
- Capital League 2 – Premiers 2017
