= Acacia Ridge FC =

- Full name: Acacia Ridge Football Club
- Founded: 1963
- Ground: Ron Proud Field, Acacia Ridge
- Capacity: 1000
- League: FQPL 3 – Metro
- 2024: 12th of 12, (Relegated); FQPL 4 – Metro
- Website: http://acaciaridgefc.com//

Acacia Ridge FC is an Australian football (soccer) club from Acacia Ridge, a suburb of Brisbane. The club was formed in 1963. It is the only club in Football Queensland history to win promotion in four successive seasons to currently compete in Football Queensland Premier League 3 - Metro.

== History ==
Acacia Ridge FC was founded by Charlie Sorrell in 1963, commencing its first season with two junior teams participating in the Brisbane Junior Soccer Association, and soon after, the club adopted royal blue and white as its playing colours. The club joined the senior ranks in 1968, entering a team in Division Six, then progressively moved up the divisions over the next decade.

Acacia Ridge FC won Division Three in 197 and was promoted to Division Two, then were further promoted to Division One in 1979 due to a reorganisation necessitated by the formation of the Queensland State League. In 1980 the club won the Division One premiership, the club's highest honour to date. The club finished runners-up in 1981, then 14th in 1982, but were still successful in being admitted to the initial season of the Brisbane Premier League in 1983. The club remained in the top tier of the Brisbane football competition for three seasons before being relegated. After this the club was promoted a further two times and played four further season (1990–1991 and 1993–1994) in the Brisbane Premier League.

Demographic changes in Acacia Ridge and surrounding suburbs contributed to a dropping off in the club’s fortunes from 2001 during which the club was relegated four times in eight seasons and fell to the lower divisions of the Metro League.

A low point was reached in 2013 when Acacia Ridge FC failed to complete its Capital League 3 fixtures, had its results annulled, and was relegated to Capital League 4.

Since 2014, Acacia Ridge FC has been coached by Zoran Simunovic who has led a revival in the club’s fortunes. Starting from the bottom of the Brisbane football pyramid, the club has achieved three successive promotions (four overall promotions), finishing premiers of Capital League 4 in 2014, Capital League 3 in 2015, then winning the second promotion spot in Capital League 2 in 2016. Football Brisbane had restructured the leagues in 2018 which therefore granted Acacia Ridge FC automatic promotion to the Brisbane Premier League.

== Recent seasons ==
| Season | League | | | | | | | | | | | FFA Cup |
| Season | Division (tier) | Pld | W | D | L | GF | GA | GD | Pts | Position | Finals Series | FFA Cup |
|---|---|---|---|---|---|---|---|---|---|---|---|---|
| 2008 | Metro 1 (6) | 22 | 11 | 5 | 6 | 50 | 34 | 16 | 38 | 3rd ↓ | Semi-Finalist | Not yet founded |
| 2009 | Metro 4 Silver (9) | 22 | 10 | 2 | 10 | 53 | 64 | −11 | 32 | 7th ↑ | DNQ | Not yet founded |
| 2010 | Metro 3 Silver (8) | 22 | 5 | 4 | 13 | 38 | 76 | −38 | 19 | 8th ↑ | DNQ | Not yet founded |
| 2011 | Metro 2 (7) | 22 | 8 | 1 | 13 | 49 | 56 | −7 | 25 | 7th | DNQ | Not yet founded |
| 2012 | Metro 2 (7) | 21 | 10 | 4 | 7 | 37 | 35 | 2 | 34 | 4th ↑ | Semi-Finalist | Not yet founded |
| 2013 | Capital League 3 (6) | Withdrew with record: P16 W4 D4 L8 GF25 GA41 Pts16. Record expunged. | | | | | | | | 12th ↓ | DNQ | Not yet founded |
| 2014 | Capital League 4 (7) | 21 | 17 | 2 | 2 | 106 | 20 | 86 | 53 | 1st ↑ | Champions | Qualifying round |
| 2015 | Capital League 3 (6) | 22 | 17 | 2 | 3 | 77 | 23 | 54 | 53 | 1st ↑ | Finalist | Preliminary Round 2 |
| 2016 | Capital League 2 (5) | 22 | 15 | 3 | 4 | 69 | 18 | 51 | 48 | 2nd ↑ | Champions | Preliminary Round 5 |
| 2017 | Capital League 1 (4) | 22 | 11 | 1 | 10 | 40 | 33 | 7 | 34 | 5th | DNQ | Preliminary Round 3 |
| 2018 | Brisbane Premier League (3) | 22 | 7 | 1 | 14 | 34 | 46 | −12 | 22 | 10th | DNQ | Preliminary Round 2 |
| 2019 | Brisbane Premier League (3) | 22 | 6 | 2 | 14 | 27 | 41 | −14 | 20 | 8th | DNQ | Preliminary Round 3 |
| 2020 | Brisbane Premier League (3) *COVID-19* | 16 | 7 | 0 | 9 | 26 | 36 | −10 | 21 | 6th | BPL Silver Plate Champions | Preliminary Round 2 |
| 2021 | Brisbane Premier League (4) | 22 | 10 | 3 | 9 | 42 | 47 | -5 | 33 | 6th | DNQ | Preliminary Round 4 |
| 2022 | Football Queensland Premier League 3 - Metro (4) | 0 | 0 | 0 | 0 | 0 | 0 | 0 | 0 | * | * | Preliminary Round * |

| Key: | Premiers / Champions | Promoted ↑ | Relegated ↓ |

The tier is the level in the Australian soccer league system

== Current squad ==
- Roki Samardzija
- Mitchell Collishaw
- Filip Zirojevic
- Marko Simunovic
- Tu Nguyen
- Simon Anthony
- Ivan Simunovic
- Miguel Nydam
- Santiago Marin
- Jairo Castillo
- Nick Wilson
- Adnan Jakupovic
- Quan Nguyen
- Johnathan Martinez
- Jarryd Gore
- Jeremy Stout
- Robert Armstrong
- Kurt O'Brien
- Gustavo Perez
- Juan Jaimes

== Notable players ==
- Antonis Papasavvas
- Antonis Iliadis
- Michal Habánek

== Honours ==
- Brisbane Division 3 – Premiers 1976
- Brisbane Division 1 – Premiers 1980
- Brisbane Division 2 – Champions 1988
- Brisbane Division 2 – Premiers 1989
- Capital League 4 – Champions and Premiers 2014
- Capital League 3 – Premiers 2015
- Capital League 2 – Champions 2016
- Pig 'N' Whistle Canale Cup – Runners up 2019
- Brisbane Premier League Silver Plate (*COVID-19*) – Champions 2020
