= Mitchelton FC =

Mitchelton Football Club
- Full name: Mitchelton Football Club
- Nickname: Mitchie
- Founded: 1920; 106 years ago
- Ground: Teralba Park
- Capacity: 2,000
- President: Roger McIntosh
- Head Coach: Oliver Harling
- League: Queensland Premier League 2
- 2024: 12th of 12 (relegated); FQPL
- Website: http://www.mitchiefc.org.au
Home colours	Away colours

Mitchelton Football Club is an Australian soccer club based in Everton Park, a suburb in Brisbane's inner-west, Queensland, Australia. Founded in 1920, the club competes in the Football Queensland Premier League.

== Overview ==
The club was founded in 1920, being the second oldest registered football club in Brisbane. This family-based club had 1125 playing members in the 2014 season and has members ranging from 4 to 60 years old, having 13 fields to cater for all ages. Mitchelton FC were lucky enough to have received the Ausport Club Development Award in 2005 awarded by the Australian Sports Commission.

After 83 years, Mitchelton finally got promoted to the highest competition in Queensland, the Brisbane Premier League for the 2004 season.

In 2009, Mitchelton were relegated to the Brisbane Premier League Division 1 after only scoring 1 point in the entire season.

In the 2010 season, Mitchelton finished 11th on the Ladder scoring 35 points.

The 2011 season sparked a revival for the club under coach Leo Sirianni, finishing 6th on the ladder and making it to the qualifying finals, where they were beaten by the 3rd placed, Ipswich Knights Soccer Club.

The 2012 season showed continued improvement with a 3rd-place finish in the league.

2013 however will go down as a season to remember for Mitchelton FC. Playing in Capital League 1 (renamed Division 1 – same league as last 3 years) Mitchelton incredibly won all 22 regular season games, semi-final and Grand Final to complete 24 consecutive wins, a Brisbane record. Due to a Football Brisbane ruling, no teams would be promoted to the Brisbane Premier League in 2014, so Mitchelton again play in Capital League 1.

2014. Mitchie have a record 1125 playing members in 90 teams. The senior men's team win the Capital League 1 title by 11 points to gain promotion to the Brisbane Premier League

== History ==
- 1916

Some of the pioneering families of the district played soccer but due to World War 1 the club was not officially registered

- 1920

Mitchelton Soccer Club registered/founded

- 1930-2

The team then known as the Black Diamonds won the YMCA Inter-suburban Cup in 3 consecutive seasons

- 1933

Establishment of a Mitchelton Junior team A meeting called by Fred Gray, his father and George Green was held on a footpath under a convenient street light. The outcome was a team of youngsters, known as Mitchelton Rovers, who wore white shirts with blue trim, being formed. The team played Junior Minor for Mitchie, graduated to Junior, were interrupted by World War II, reassembled in 1947 as Juniors and graduated to Senior (Third Division) in 1948.

- 1949/53

Senior Teams played in the Second Division

- 1954/59

Senior Teams played in Third Division

- 1954

Juniors won Third Division Premiership and Round 1 Cup

- 1960

The Bee Gees perform at the club's annual Trophy Night

- 1962

First ladies soccer game played in Brisbane The Brisbane ladies competition was started as a result of teams from Mitchelton and Annerley being invited to play at a carnival day at Mitchelton on 18 May 1962. The official competition commenced in 1965 under the Brisbane Junior Soccer Association.

- 1971

Junior Sub Committee formed With increasing numbers of juniors the Mitchelton Soccer Football Club Committee decided to form a Junior Sub Committee. Previously juniors played for free, in 1971 a fee of $0.50 per player to be registered was charged.

- 1973

The club continued to play on Bell's Paddock (Mitchelton Oval) but by the late 1960s, it was obvious that the ground could not accommodate the club's growth and the field was not suitable for the playing of good football because of its slope from Samford Road towards the train line and the lower end of the rugby league field. The playing surface, despite regular top dressing by volunteers, remained too rough. It became somewhat a standing joke that topdressing of the soccer field would be washed on to the league field in heavy storms. The junior field between the main field and the train line at the back of the picture theatre was unable to sustain any decent growth of grass. Several reasons for this have been expressed but it seems certain that it was an environmental problem resulting from the Army being based there during World War 1. Action had to be taken to identify a suitable new home ground and a Sub Committee was established under Ross Black to oversee the search. Another member of his committee was Duncan McDonald, a qualified surveyor, whose expertise in laying out the new fields was to prove invaluable.

- 1974

Field Layout at Teralba Park determined The Sub Committee liaised with the Brisbane City Council which suggested the market gardens resumed at the bottom of Teralba Park and with a lot of work it could have been ready for 1976. Once the field layout was determined, construction could commence. This would take some time due to the availability of Council resources. A building fund was set up and teams were requested to raise $100.00 each towards the new project. Other fundraisers to keep the club going were the Miss Junior Soccer competition, Annual Fete, Brook Hotel Raffles and a stall at the RNA Exhibition.

- 1975

Mitchelton Sports Club formed To meet Brisbane City Council requirements for obtaining a lease on Council land at Teralba Park, the club format was changed to include multi sports. Activities included were Senior and Junior Soccer, netball, rugby league, touch football, and cricket. Baseball and Tee ball were added later. Foundation members of the Sports Club were: Terry & May Anderson, Frank & June Barrett, Kevin S Jones, Arthur & Merle Heiner, Glen & Dianne Stevens, Lois Clark, Graham & Gwen Barker, Alberto & Maria Bartilomo, Col & Ros Ivey, Warren & Shirley Beasley, Andy & Ada Thompson, and Edna Jones. Sports Club Guarantors were: Terry & May Anderson, Ross Black, Phil Harris, Arthur & Merle Heiner, Kevin & Vicki Jones, Kevin S Jones, Des Miles, Andy & Ada Thompson. The objects of the organisation were to provide and maintain playing fields and amenities at Teralba Park and promote, foster, support and encourage soccer and other approved sports. The 1975 Committee was an eager and dedicated group keen to progress with the new grounds and club house at the new park. A parks sub committee and a finance sub committee were set up to manage future development for the Teralba Park complex.

- 1977

Teralba Park becomes a reality The move to Teralba Park could not come soon enough as the number of teams fielded by the club doubled in the 3-year period from 1973 to 1976 to 3 senior, 2 ladies and 22 junior teams. Training continued at Mitchelton Oval with matches conducted at Teralba Park. Additional lighting provided for training in 1976 at Mitchelton Oval was transferred to the new field. The old market gardener's cottage was transformed by volunteers into canteen and change rooms. While the Brisbane City Council could not have been more helpful, regrettably, large quantities of the beautifully rich market garden soil were removed from the main field to be used to develop two more cricket fields at Marchant Park. Only a small layer of topsoil remained and this required the Club to undertake further remedial work to bring the ground up to it present high standard. Teralba Park provides one of the largest areas of playing fields in Brisbane and the Club can look forward to further growth in the future.

- 1977

Des Miles, Referee, formerly a member of the club's 1959 premiership team and Senior Club President awarded his FIFA referee's badge

- 1978

Building of new club house at Teralba Park commenced The plans for the new club house were submitted to Council in 1977 and construction commenced in 1978. Due to problems with the lease and construction of a bank protection wall to stop land erosion, building had to be halted. Eventually permission was granted to complete the toilet block and still carry on fixtures. Working bees conducted by club members at the new ground were well attended making the effort both work and social. Today's club house stands as a monument to the volunteers who devoted much time and effort in its construction. To mark the move to Teralba Park, a march of players, coaches, and families was led by the then Club President, Rob Beck, from Samford Road to Teralba Park.

- 1978

Club Constitution provided for colours of green and white with yellow as a supplementary colour The club originally played in the Black Diamonds' colours but when reformed, the green and white strip was chosen.

- 1979

Second Division team defeat Merton East 2–0 in Second Division Grand Final One of the club's most important results was in 1979 when we defeated Merton East 2–0 to win the Second Division Grand Final at Perry Park. The Final was watched by a huge crowd of Mitchie supporters who witnessed a stellar performance by the Mitchie team. Mitchelton was coached by Syd Tucker and the team line-up was as follows: Dave Mewburn, Ian Perry, John Coffey, Michael Hayes, Neil Orford, Ritchie Shortman, Peter McDonald, Greg McDonald, Garth Jones, Phil Cruse, Ross Denny, Barry Anderson, Graham Morey, and Dave Gallagher. The following season Merton East turned the tables on Mitchelton winning the Grand Final 3–1.

- 1980

Club Patron, Roy Harvey, Lord Mayor of Brisbane, opened our new club house When work stopped on the construction of the club house, vandalism became a problem and the club sought the assistance of its Patron, Roy Harvey, Lord Mayor of Brisbane, to proceed with the building. Alderman Harvey gave permission for the work to resume and opened the new club house on its completion. Fund raising for the new club house included seeking $100 donations from Foundation Members, the sale of Bricks and guarantees from Sports Club Guarantors for the Commonwealth Bank.

- 1980

Club Diamond Jubilee Events commemorating the Diamond Jubilee were a Dinner Dance held at the new club house on 26 April 1980 and the Presentation Night at the Gaythorne RSL on 17 October 1980.

- 1981

Main playing field at Teralba Park named "Fred Gray Memorial Field" On 8 June 1981 the main playing field at Teralba Park was named "Fred Gray Memorial Field" in honour of the late Life Member, Fred Gray, for his part in the establishment of the club and for his many years of untiring service in making Mitchelton Club into what it had become. The dedication was held in conjunction with the annual Under 9 Carnival and Fete. A highlight of the day was the arrival by helicopter of England and Everton striker, Bob Latchford accompanied by Jim Hermiston and Ron Smith. With completion of the club house, the Committee could then concentrate on more lighting, fencing, and closing off the original entrance from Griffith Street and opening the road from Osborne Road.

- 1983

The bitumen road from Osborne Road to Clubhouse opened On training nights dust from the dirt road from Osborne Road to the playing fields created a haze over Teralba Park as vehicles transporting players arrived and departed. The construction of the bitumen road was a priority for the Sports Club under the then President Barrie Adams. The cost of the road was $12,955 and was paid for by funds raised by dedicated club members.

- 1983

Soccer superstar, George Best, visits the club

- 1984

Additional Park Land Leased Alderman Roy Harvey continued as Patron and approval was given by the Council for the lease of additional land. A Development Committee was formed to prepare plans for advancement of the club up to 1990.

- 1995

Amalgamation with Brisbane Sports Club proceeds A consortium known as the Brisbane Sports Club, led by Paul Novak offered to take over the running of the Mitchelton Sports Club and proposed a major upgrade of the Teralba Park facilities and football operations. Sports Club members voted to accept the proposal leading to Ex-Socceroos Greg Brown and Robbie Dunn playing for the club and the acquisition of ex-international, Gary McDowall, as Club Coach for 1996. This change is seen as one of the highlights in Mitchelton Football Club's history.

- 1995

75th Anniversary Dinner held at Parliament House A huge turnout of former and current players and supporters takes place at Queensland Parliament House.

- 2000

Junior teams received B.N.& D. Junior Soccer Association "Outstanding Club of the Year" award The award was made to the club in the B.N.&D Junior Soccer Association competition achieving the highest number of points in premiership competition.

- 2002

Push for Premier League Group established To push for promotion to the Premier League, a volunteer group was established to develop a strategy to ensure the club's competitiveness for promotion to the Premier League and its continuity in that competition.

- 2003

Senior team promoted to Premier League Another significant moment in the club's history was the First Division team winning a two legged play-off against Ipswich Knights (from the Premier League) to gain entry into the 2004 Premier League. Mitchelton had finished second to Eastern Suburbs after the completion of the home and away season. Mitchelton played the first play-off game at Teralba Park and won 3–0 courtesy of goals from Matt Hendra, Damian Pilat and Peter Josey. The return game at Ipswich was a 0–0 draw ensuring Mitchelton's victory in the play-off. The members of the team which won promotion to the top division for the club after 83 years in lower divisions were: Rob Coulter, Adam Pilat, Dave O'Reilly, Erik Musiol, Peter Bancroft (coach), Matt Hendra, Jason Poggi, Jason Roberts, Peter Josey, Matthew Jones, Keith Shaw, Daniel Timms, Andrew Balzat, Andrew Poyser, Damian Pilat, Andrew Hendra, and Nick McCallum.

- 2005

Mitchelton Sports Club wins Australian Sports Commission 2005 Ausport Award for excellence in club development The purpose of the 2005 Award was to recognise and reward the achievements, success stories and best practices of individuals and groups within the Australian Sporting system. It recognised quality management practices in areas of leadership, planning, people and members. An independent panel of representatives from the sports industry assessed nominations in each award category against key criteria to select the finalists. The Australian Sports Commission's general manager of Sport Performance and Development said that Mitchelton Sports Club represented a great example of an effective and well-managed sports organisation which was driven by the principle of continuous improvement. He said that Mitchelton Sports Club exemplified good management practices by effectively delivering a range of programs and initiatives to improve services to members. The club was commended for developing a strategic plan to improve its management practices, to be more competitive, and to grow its business which contributed towards its senior soccer being promoted to the Premier League. The club was also commended for its initiatives to promote the club's activities through its match program and fixtures to help raise the club's profile. Club President, Rohan Cassell attended the presentation of the award.

- 2006

Mitchelton Sports Club organises 40 year, 30 year, 20 year & 10 year Player Reunion In 2006 the club held a reunion for players who played with the club in 1960s, 1976, 1986 and 1996. The club was unable to locate team lists from 1966 but a number of players from that era attended.

- 2007

Mitchelton Football Club fields a record 70 teams The breakdown of teams for the 2007 season is: 4 senior, 4 Over 35, 58 junior, 4 ladies (2 senior and 2 Junior). Total registrations are about 700 players.

- 2013

Mitchelton win the Premiership/Grand Final double in the newly named Capital League 1 ( old Division 1) with a stunning 24 wins in a row. Despite protests, Football Brisbane refuse to promote any teams to the Brisbane Premier League for the 2014 season.

- 2014

Mitchie have a record 1125 playing members in 90 teams. The senior men's team win the Capital League 1 title by 11 points to gain promotion to the Brisbane Premier League.
