= University of Queensland FC =

UQFC Inc.
- Full name: The University of Queensland Football Club Inc.
- Nicknames: UQFC, Uni, Uni of Qld, UQ, The Students
- Founded: 1955
- Ground: Kenmore and St Lucia Campus, Brisbane
- President: Andrew Bird
- Treasurer: James Wragg
- Secretary: Jo Grainger
- League: FQPL 3 – Metro
- 2024: 10th of 13
- Website: http://www.uqfc.com.au
| Home colours | Away colours | Third colours |

The University of Queensland Football Club is the soccer club of the University of Queensland. The club was formed in 1955, and currently hosts its highest teams in Football Brisbane's Capital League One (Men & Women) and the Women's National Premier League. The club has a tradition of playing attractive, attacking soccer and, with 90 teams in junior and senior football in 2017, it is one of the largest clubs in both Brisbane and Queensland.

== History ==
Long known as 'The University of Queensland Soccer Club', the club achieved a long-held desire to incorporate football into its name and was reborn in 2010 as 'The University of Queensland Football Club Inc'. To secure a future in Brisbane's top-flight competitions and a strong junior base, the club merged with Kenmore Juniors in 2012 and is now known as UQFC Inc with fields on the campus in St Lucia and at Cubberla Creek Reserve, Kenmore.

In August 2009, the club made history with two teams making the Football Brisbane Metro Cup final – the first, and still only, time this has been achieved. In a close encounter, UQ's Metro 1 side defeated the club's Metro 4 team (known as the Shaggy Dogs) with a score of 3–2 at Perry Park. This was UQFC's first cup title in 20 years with the last Cup win back in 1989. The 'Shaggy Dogs' also made history, being the first team below second division to reach a cup final.

In 2010, the men's Premier Division 1 team secured promotion to the Brisbane Premier League followed by the women's Sapphire team in 2015 – the same year, UQFC joined the Women's NPL competition. In 2016, both Men's & Women's Brisbane Premier League teams were relegated to Capital League One, although the club still maintains its Women's NPL license in 2017

On 20 September 2010, the club took out several major awards at the 2010 Football Brisbane Gala Awards ceremony. The club was awarded:

- 2010 Senior Club of the Year – for outstanding performance across all 14 Football Brisbane teams
- 2010 Player of the Year (Premier Div 1) – to club captain, Peter Moore
- 2010 Club Champions (Premier Div 1) – for outstanding performance across both Premier and Premier Reserve squads.

== See also ==
- University of Queensland
- University of Queensland Union (UQU)
