= Football Queensland Premier League – Metro =

- Founded: 16 August 2021; 5 years ago (Note: The third division was founded in 1983 as the Brisbane Premier League, and the fourth, fifth, and sixth divisions were founded in 2013 as the Capital League 1–3, before they formed the FQPL Metro in 2022.)
- Country: Australia
- State: Queensland
- Number of clubs: 45: Division 3: 12; Division 4: 12; Division 5: 12; Division 6: 7
- Level on pyramid: 5–8
- Promotion to: Football Queensland Premier League
- Domestic cup(s): National; Australia Cup; Regional; Canale Cup
- Current champions: Newmarket (2025) Metro-3
- Current premiers: Virginia United (2025) Metro-3

The Football Queensland Premier League – Metro is a Queensland soccer league that was founded in 2021 and administered by Football Queensland Metro. It consists of four divisions; Division 3, Division 4, Division 5 and Division 6 in connection with the Football Queensland Premier League's first and second divisions run by Football Queensland.

The league premiers earn automatic promotion to the next tier up; with Division 3 clubs gaining promotion to the Queensland Premier League (the third-tier league in Queensland from season 2020 onwards), while the second place team participates in a playoff series with the other south east Queensland conference premiers for the second promotion spot. The bottom two teams at the end of the season are relegated to the next tier in Brisbane.

== History ==
In August 2021, Football Queensland confirmed that the Brisbane Premier League and Capital League would be replaced by a newly formatted league for all Brisbane divisions run by Football Brisbane (now named Football Queensland Metro).

== Current members ==
The teams for Season 2025 are shown in alphabetical order in the table below.

=== Division 3 ===
Team	Home Ground	Location	Founded
AC Carina	Brisbane Abruzzo Club	Carina	1984
Bayside United	Don Randall Oval	Lota	1974
Centenary Stormers	Atthows Park	Darra	2000
Ipswich Knights	Eric Evans Oval	Ipswich	1998
Mt Gravatt Hawks	Dittmer Park	Mount Gravatt	1960
Newmarket FC	McCook Park	Newmarket	1949
North Brisbane	Prentice Park	Lutwyche	1957
North Pine	Bob Brock Park	Dakabin	1974
Redcliffe Dolphins	Talobilla Park	Kippa-Ring	2010
Springfield United	Springfield Central Sports Complex	Springfield Central	2008
UQFC	St Lucia Reserve	Kenmore	1955
Virginia United	Albert Bishop Park	Brisbane	1970
Yeronga Eagles FC	Leyshon Park	Yeronga	1989

=== Division 4 ===
Team	Home Ground	Location	Founded
Acacia Ridge	Ron Proud Field	Acacia Ridge	1963
Annerley FC	Elder Oval	Annerley	1945
Bardon Latrobe FC	Bowman Park	Bardon	1916
Ipswich City FC	Sutton Park	Brassall	1975
Logan Metro FC	Compton Park	Woodridge	2012
Logan Roos	Oates Park	Woodridge	2017
Moggill FC	Bellbowrie Sports Club	Moggill	1974
Narangba Eagles	Harris Avenue Sport Complex	Narangba	1992
New Farm United SC	New Farm Park	New Farm	1986
Ripley Valley	Briggs Road Complex	Ripley	2018
The Gap	Walton Bridge Reserve	The Gap	1944
Western Spirit FC	Kippen Park	Goodna	1974

=== Division 5 ===
Team	Home Ground	Location
Bethania Rams	Opperman Park	Bethania
Brighton Bulldogs	Wakefield Park	Brighton
FC Old Salisbury Bridge	Russ Hall Park	Salisbury
Jimboomba United	Kurrajong Park	Jimboomba
Kangaroo Point Rovers FC	Raymond Park	Kangaroo Point
Logan Village	Big River Country Park	Logan Village
Pine Hills Braza	James Drysdale Reserve	Bunya
Pine Rivers	Wendy Allison Park	Strathpine
Slacks Creek Tigers	Usher Park	Slacks Creek
Tarragindi Tigers	Esher Park	Tarragindi
Westside Grovely	Grovely Sports Ground	Grovely
Willowburn FC	Griffiths Park	Harlaxton

=== Division 6 ===
Team	Home Ground	Location
Australian Catholic University	ACU	Banyo
Bribie Island	Bribie Island Recreational Grounds	Bongaree
Mooroondu	William Taylor Sports Field	Thornside
Oxley United	Dunlop Park	Corinda
Park Ridge FC	Hubner Park	Park Ridge
Queensland University of Technology	Nudgee Recreation Reserve	Nudgee
Ridge Hills	Stanley Day Park	Bald Hills
Teviot Downs	Teviot Downs Sports Field	Greenbank

== Honours ==
Champions
Season	Division 3	Division 4	Division 5	Division 6
2022	St George Willawong	Redcliffe Dolphins	Springfield United	Yeronga Eagles
2023	Virginia United	Brisbane Knights	Kangaroo Point Rovers	Pine Hills Braza
2024	Newmarket	Yeronga Eagles	Narangba Eagles	Slacks Creek
2025	Newmarket	Moggill FC	Logan Village	QUT

Premiers
Season	Division 3	Division 4	Division 5	Division 6
2022	The Lakes	North Pine	Springfield United	Ridge Hills
2023	Bayside United	Brisbane Knights	Yeronga Eagles	Pine Hills Braza
2024	Brisbane Knights	Yeronga Eagles	Narangba Eagles	Slacks Creek
2025	Virginia United	Logan Roos	Logan Village	QUT
