= BSFC =

BSFC may refer to:

- Barrow Sixth Form College
- Berkeley Student Food Collective
- Birkenhead Sixth Form College
- Blackpool Sixth Form College
- Bolton Sixth Form College
- Boston Society of Film Critics
- Brake-specific fuel consumption

It may also refer to one of the following association football clubs:

- Ballysillan Swifts F.C.
- Bangor Swifts F.C.
- Beaconsfield SYCOB F.C.
- Berlin Swifts F.C.
- Bethlehem Steel FC
- Billingham Synthonia F.C.
- Bishop's Stortford F.C.
- Bolehall Swifts F.C.
- Bly Spartans F.C.
- Blyth Spartans F.C.
- Brache Sparta F.C.
- Brereton Social F.C.
- Brett Sports F.C.
- Bromsgrove Sporting F.C.
- Budleigh Salterton F.C.
- Burton Swifts F.C.

== See also ==
- BSAFC
- BSFS (disambiguation)
