= History of soccer in Brisbane, Queensland =

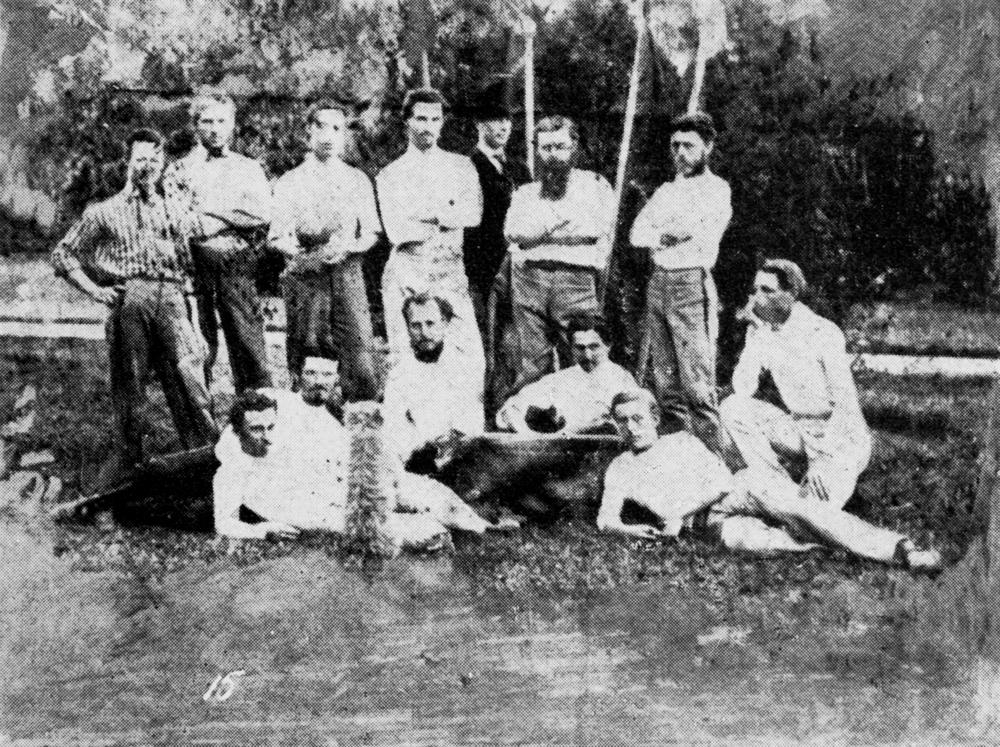
A Brisbane football team, 1870. Second from the left (standing) is Robert Philp, who would become Queensland Premier during Federation. (Note: This image, from the John Oxley Library at the State Library of Queensland, is a photograph of the Brisbane FC, which played according to the 'Victorian rules' code (likely taken by commercial photographer, Daniel Marquis). It features in the Queenslander newspaper of 7 August 1909, which gives the names of those in the photo)

The earliest known records of regular soccer games in Brisbane date from the early 1880s, when a group comprising mostly Scottish immigrants commenced playing at Queen's Park, adjacent to Alice and Edward Streets in the city (now part of the City Botanic Gardens) and vacant land in Melbourne Street South Brisbane, between Grey and Stanley Streets. This group of players subsequently formed the Anglo-Queensland Football Association in early 1884, and commenced playing fixtures at the sports field behind the Pineapple Hotel, in Main Street Kangaroo Point, and at Queen's Park, in June 1884.

After a promising start, the game in Brisbane then developed erratically, hampered by the overwhelming popularity of the Rugby football codes: initially Rugby Union, which had commenced in Brisbane several years earlier, then rugby league from the 1920s onwards. The game also suffered from ongoing periodic disunity, caused initially by disaffected clubs from nearby Ipswich and later by disagreements over funding of the game and payments to players. In contrast with this the game boomed in Ipswich, with clubs from that city dominating Brisbane and combined Brisbane-Ipswich competitions until around 1960.

The large numbers of European and British immigrants arriving after World War II changed the character of the local game dramatically, as it led to the formation of wealthy ethnic-based clubs, which dominated Brisbane competitions during the 1960s and 1970s. This also created a perception amongst many members of the public that soccer was a 'migrants' game' (and as a result, sometimes referred to as 'wogball').

From the 1980s onwards, the local game thrived in terms of participation by junior and senior males and large numbers of female players, but not at a professional level. Despite a promising start, the Brisbane Roar FC, which joined the re-formed national A-League competition in its inaugural year (2005) and won the premiership in 2010-11 and 2013–14, and championships in 2011, 2012 and 2014, is yet to make serious inroads into the popularity enjoyed by the other football codes.

== Mid-1800s: First football games in Brisbane ==
Football has been played in Brisbane from very early times, as evidenced by this notice in The Moreton Bay Courier in 1849 (a mere 25 years after the arrival of the first European settlers in the region), at which time the population was around 2000 people, many of whom were former convicts and poor Irish immigrants:

ANNIVERSARY.
TO the SPORTING BLADES of BRISBANE.
BEING determined that the Anniversary [now called Australia Day] shall not pass over without a little fun, in addition to the usual English Sports, the Lads of Kangaroo Point
CHALLENGE
all comers to a Game of Foot Ball – preliminaries to be settled at the Commercial Inn, Kangaroo Point, on the evening of the 24th.

Given the inchoate nature of the various types of football at that time, they may have been playing simple mob football. Alternatively, they could have been playing in accordance with the recently published Rugby school rules (1845) or the Cambridge rules (1848), the latter being the forerunner of the laws of association football.

=== First football clubs ===
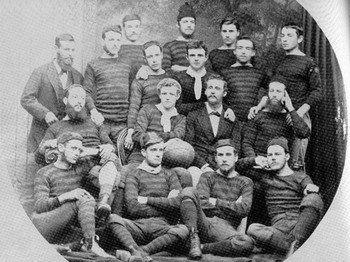
Brisbane Football Club ca 1879 (playing Victorian rules and rugby rules)

Organised games of football were being played in Brisbane by the mid-1860s, as reported by the Brisbane Courier in 1866: "ON the football ground, on Saturday afternoon, there was no match; but two sides were chosen, and a very lively game was played ... Five goals were kicked ... The football season will end in a few weeks and the committee of the club contemplate getting up some athletic sports as an appropriate finale." However, it is most likely that this report referred to the Brisbane Football Club (formed in 1866) and that they were playing in accordance with the Victorian rules (codified in 1859 as the 'rules of the Melbourne Football Club', now known as Australian rules football). The 'football ground' referred to here is most likely the area then known as 'Queen's Park' (now part of the City Botanic Gardens) or possibly the sports field located in the area then known as 'Green Hills' (then located beside Countess Street Petrie Terrace opposite the Victoria Barracks - now occupied by the Northern Busway), where cricket matches were also played since at least the early 1860s.

The first known reference to a soccer club in Brisbane was the Petrie Terrace Football Club formed in 1876, whose players initially elected to adopt the "London Association rules" (codified in 1863 - now The Football Association's 'Laws of the Game') "until better ones could be framed ...". However, it appears that the club subsequently adopted the recently codified rugby union rules (1871), as just a week later it was reported that "At a meeting of the newly-formed football club at Petrie-terrace, held yesterday evening, it was decided to call the club the "Bonnet Rouge Football Club;" the uniform to be a red cap, of any shape whatever. The rugby union rules were finally adopted, as it was understood that these had been decided upon by other Brisbane clubs."

As well as the Brisbane Football Club, the only other known Brisbane club at the time was the Rangers Football Club (formed in 1876), both of which were now playing according to both the Victorian rules and the rugby union rules.

=== First games under 'Association' rules ===
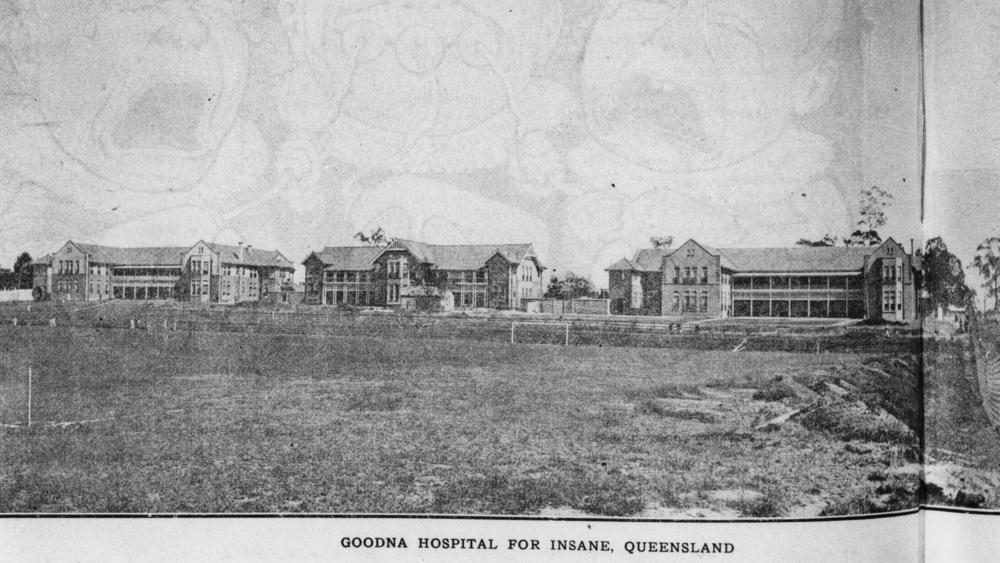
Goodna (formerly 'Woogaroo') Asylum ca 1919, showing football field in the foreground

It also appears that Brisbane FC played at least one game of 'London Association Football' ('soccer'): The Queenslander of 14 August 1875 reported that on Saturday 7 August 1875, Brisbane FC played a game against the inmates and warders of the Woogaroo Lunatic Asylum (now The Park Centre for Mental Health Treatment at Wolston Park, near Goodna): "… play commenced at half-past 2 ... One rule provided that the ball should not be handled nor carried." This evidence is corroborated by the Victorian publication The Footballer, which reported in 1875 in its section on "Football in Queensland" that "the match was played without handling the ball under any circumstances whatever (Association rules)." This is the earliest known game of 'soccer' played in the Brisbane region (and possibly in Australia) - regular games of 'soccer' did not commence in Brisbane until 1884, as noted below.

The first known club formed to play under association football rules in Brisbane was the Rangers Football Club, formed in 1883 as the 'Scottish Football Association'. The members of that first club included W. Middlebrook, W. Wordie, W. McNaughton, J.Cairns, J. Anderton, W.Cairns, W. Millar, A. Rankine (Capt.), W. Allison, A. Russell, A. Irvine and D. Gemmell.

It is not known whether this club had any links to the former Rangers Rugby club of 1876.

== 1880s: First regular games in Brisbane ==
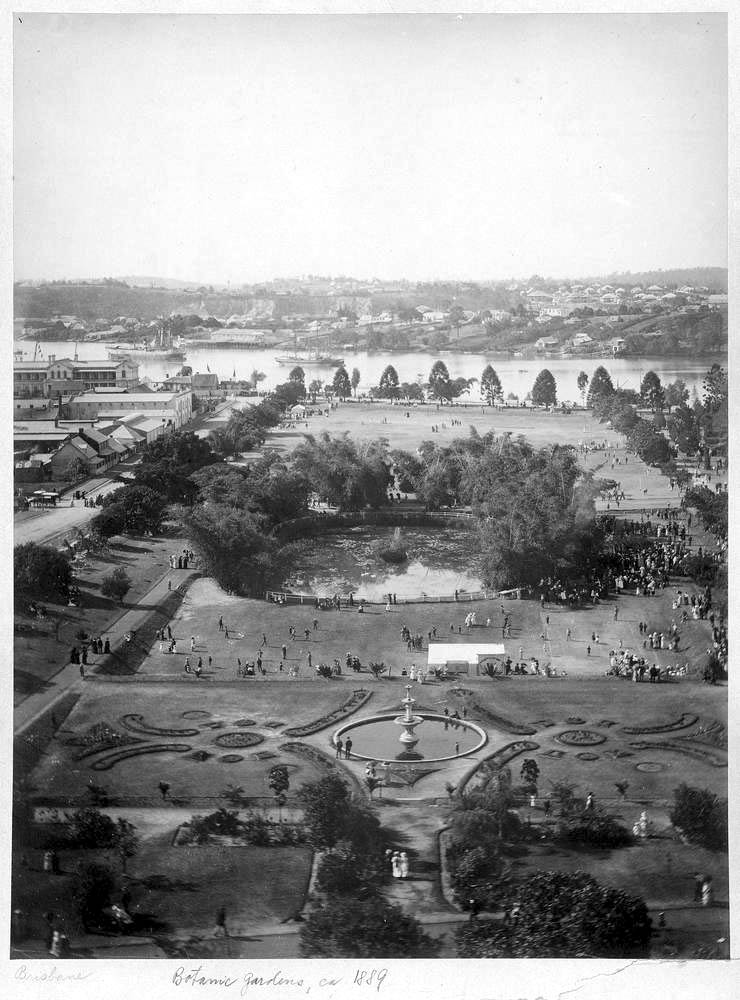
Queen's Park in the 1880s - playing field at the far end of the park (photographed from the Queensland Parliament House building)

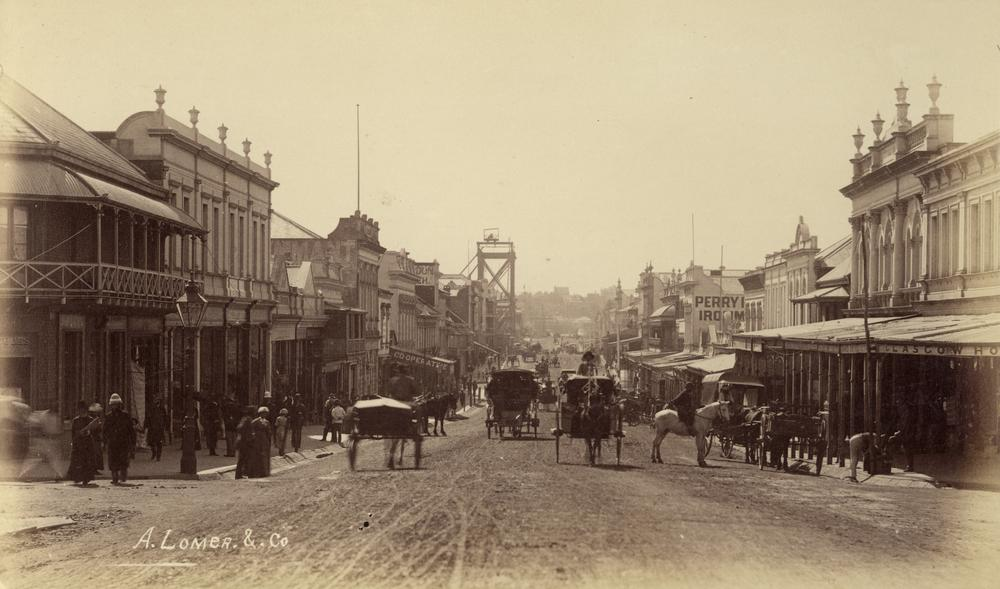
The former Australian Hotel, at the corner of Queen and Albert Streets, Brisbane, the venue for the inaugural meeting of the Anglo-Queensland Football Association on 1 May 1884, is at the extreme left of this contemporaneous image. The modified building is now occupied by shops and offices.

This decade was a boom period for immigration in the colony: Between 1881 and 1891 metropolitan Brisbane's population grew from 37,000 to 100,000. The first reported soccer matches were played by a group who originally practised at Queen's Park (now part of the Brisbane City Botanic Gardens), on the flat area near the Brisbane River, adjacent to Alice Street and between Edward and Albert Streets, around 1883 (see the far end of the park in the adjacent photograph). These players were presumably mostly recent Scottish migrants, given they were referred to as 'Scotch rulers' by players of the other codes, as well as the team names they eventually adopted. After disagreements over ground-sharing with cricketers and the Rugby Union and Victorian Rules players, they moved to vacant land in Melbourne Street South Brisbane, between Grey and Stanley Streets (the site now occupied by the Queensland Performing Arts Centre). Eventually, they received permission from the publican of the Pineapple Hotel, almost directly across the river at Kangaroo Point, to play at his 'Pineapple Sportsground' behind the hotel. This ground is now the western portion of Raymond Park).

Subsequently, the Brisbane Courier reported in early May 1884:

A MEETING of those favourable to the "Association" game of football as played in the home countries was held at the Australian Hotel last night [Thursday 1 May] ... The chair was occupied by Mr. W. McLauchlan. Among those present were a number of Scottish Association footballers who had recently arrived in the colony ... [I]t was resolved that it was desirable to form an Anglo-Queensland Football Association, and as a beginning the meeting formed the first club, the name selected being "St. Andrew's Football Club." Mr. D. McCreadie - a Queen's Park (Glasgow) player was elected president and captain of the club ... It was announced that already from twenty-seven to thirty promises to join the club had been received, and it was resolved to play a practice match tomorrow afternoon, if possible, in the Queen's Park. Mr. D. McCreadie and Mr. W.Hardgrave undertook to captain the teams.

This group was then joined by the Rangers Club and the newly formed 'Queen's Park' club (both presumably named after the well-known Glasgow football clubs) and played a series of fixtures. It is highly likely that the players were inspired by the success of the contemporary Scottish national team which, in adopting the Glasgow Queen's Park club's 'playing style', had dominated the English national teams during the 1870s and 1880s (Scottish players of the time were dubbed the 'Scotch Professors', a reference to their 'scientific' approach, which ultimately transformed the tactics of the game).

=== First fixture matches ===
The Brisbane Courier reported the first match of that first season - played on Saturday 7 June 1884:

The first match under the auspices of the Anglo-Queensland Football Association took place on the Pineapple Ground, Kangaroo Point on Saturday, the contending clubs being the Queen's Park and St Andrew's. The clubs played eleven aside, being the usual number in matches under this association. The colours were-for St Andrews dark blue and for Queen's Park blue and white. Mr Shiers was umpire for the Queen's Park, and Mr Curry filled the same position for the other side, Mr Hudson being referee. The attendance numbered about sixty, and most of them took a lively interest in the game.

The Queen's Park team comprised the following players: Brooks, Wearne (backs); Pywell, Copp (half-backs), Pearson, Holland (centre forwards), Bell, Allison (left wing), Sharp, Princeps (captain, right wing), J. Wharrie (goal). St Andrew's was captained by R. Wylie and included McCreadie, Menzies, Kyle, Currie and Angus [the rest of their team is not recorded]. Despite the "good play" of Princeps, Holland, Wearne and Allison for Queen’s Park, the Saints overwhelmed them 7-0 (with two early goals by McCreadie). Curiously, The Queenslander newspaper reported over a month later: "ST. ANDREW'S V. QUEEN'S PARK. The first round of matches of this association was played in the Botanical Gardens on Saturday between the above clubs, and resulted in a win for the St. Andrews by 7 goals to nil." This latter report provided considerable detail regarding the play and individual players, and noted goal scorers who were different from those in the Courier report. However, the Brisbane Courier report should be given historical precedence, given its earlier date.

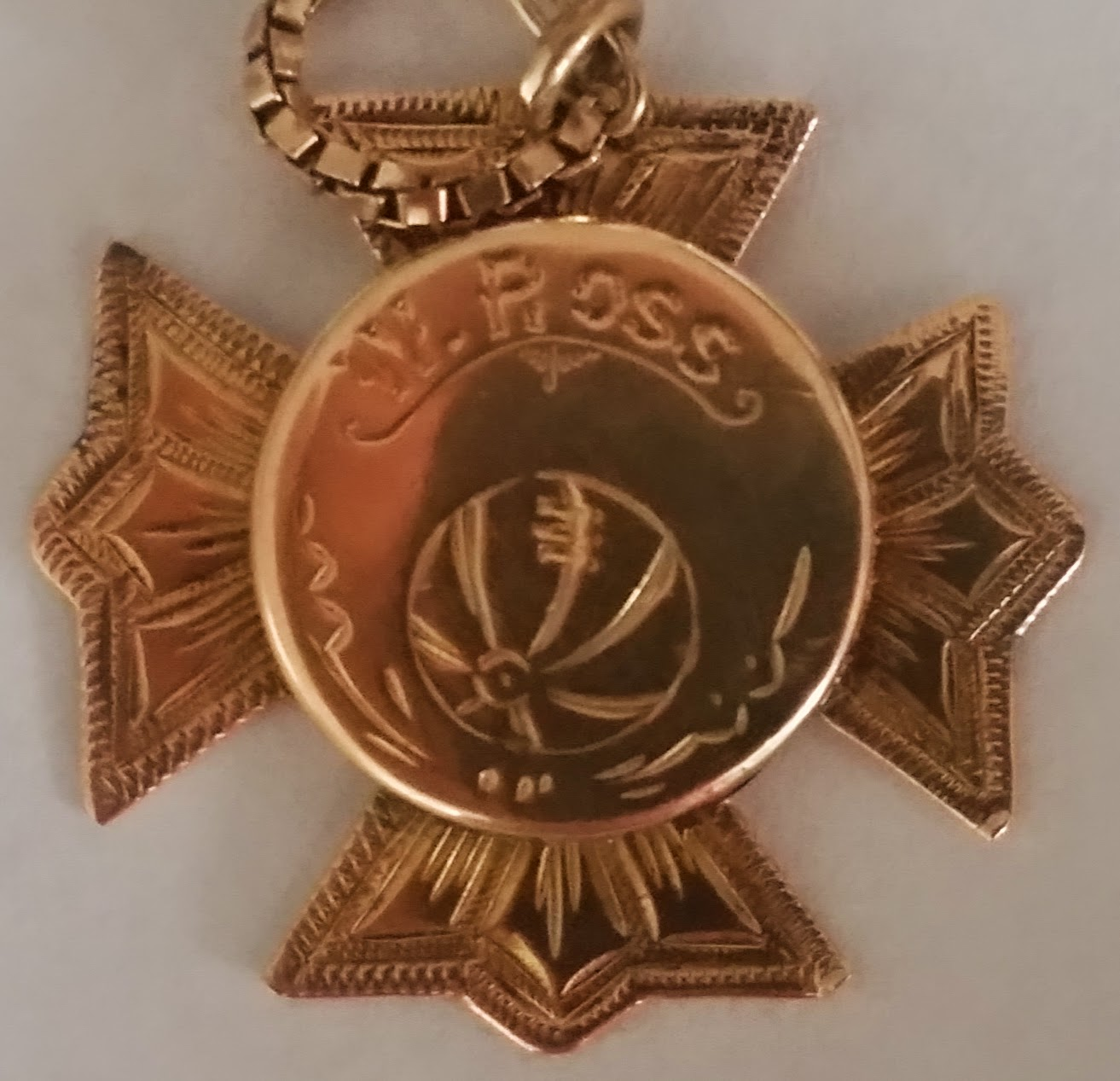
Badge awarded to W Ross in 1887 for being a member of the winning St Andrews Football Club during the Final Cup Tie event.

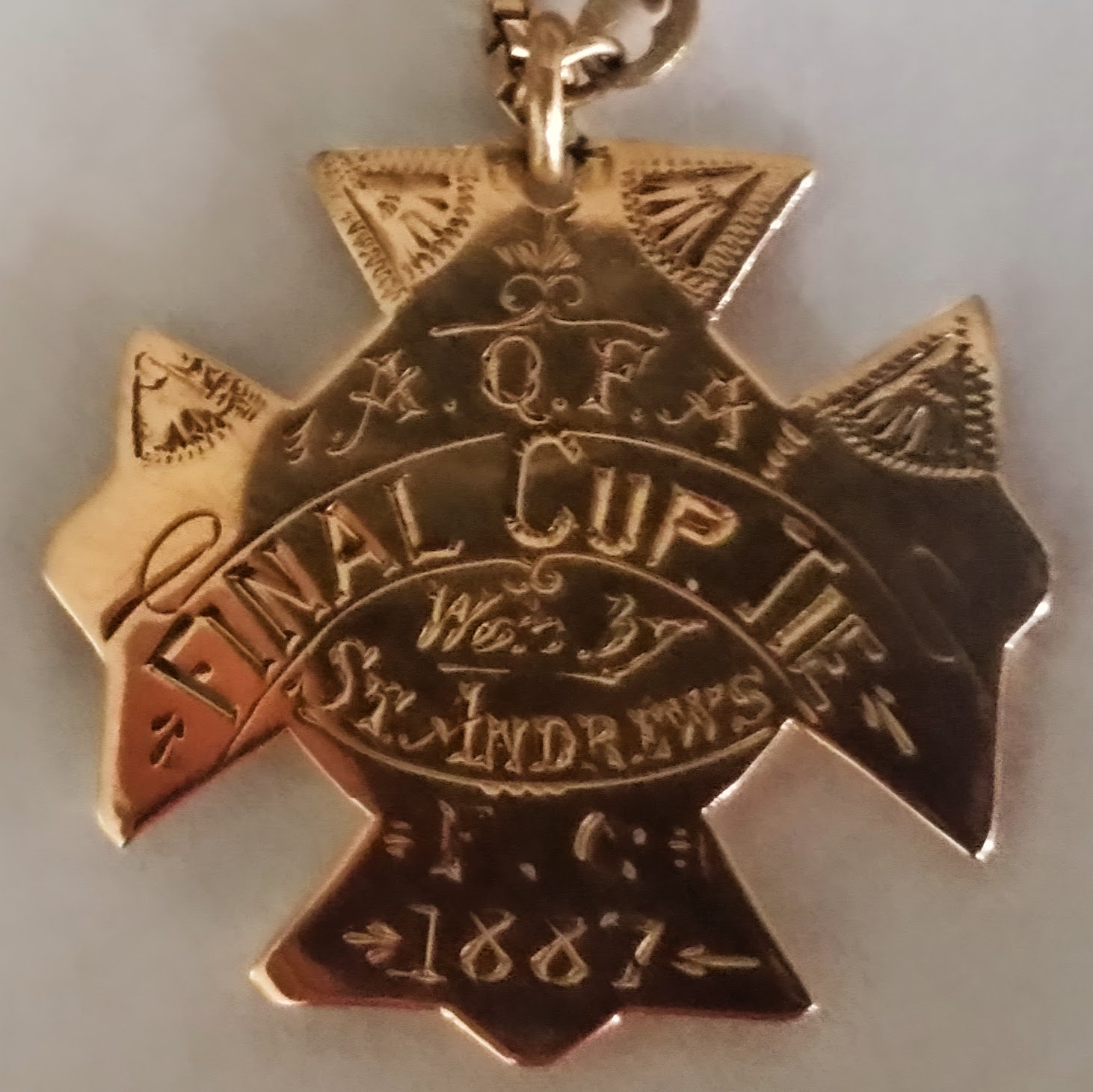
Badge awarded to W Ross in 1887 for being a member of the winning St Andrews Football Club during the Final Cup Tie event. Anglo-Queensland Football Association.

The following Saturday saw St Andrew's play Rangers (who wore white with red trim) at 3 PM on the "Pineapple Ground, Kangaroo Point", in front of 100 spectators. The game ended in a 1-1 draw, with the Brisbane Courier reporting "Thus ended a most exciting contest. Some neat passing occurred at intervals, and the ball was often "headed", and the play in general was a great improvement on that of the previous Saturday." Rangers and Queen's Park (captained by Andrew Rankine and Arthur Princeps respectively) did not meet until the fourth match of the season, played at the Pineapple Ground on 18 July 1884, where the Rangers won 3-1 in front of a crowd of around 100 people. The final tie of that season between St Andrew's and Rangers was held at the Queen's Park ground on Saturday 9 August. The players were presumably playing as amateurs, as a newspaper advertisement promoting that game noted that "Collection Boxes in aid of the Hospital will be at Garden Gates." The match was won by Rangers 1-0 and they were awarded the winners' badges.

The game progressed the following year, as at least two of the clubs had second teams: a newspaper report in late 1885 described "Second Rangers" defeating "Second Queen's Park" 2-1 "at the Pine Apple ground". Whilst there are no known records of organised games under 'Association' rules prior to the 1884 season, a speech at the Queen's Park Football Club annual dinner at the end of the 1885 season by Mr Pring Roberts (a guest representing the local Rugby Union) suggests there may gave been earlier games. Mr Roberts acknowledged "the increasing popularity of the [Association football] game in the metropolis and the great strides made since its revival by the Anglo-Football Association some two seasons ago ..." .

By 1886, the game was rapidly becoming popular, as around 400 spectators watched as Queen's Park hosted St Andrew's for the opening match of the season, with Saint Andrew's winning 7-0 (including an own goal). Other matches reported in August 1886 included St Andrew's 5-1 against the Rangers at 'The Pineapple', Second St Andrew's 3-1 against Swifts at Albert Park and the newly formed Bundamba Rovers 3-1 against Queenslanders at Bundamba. St Andrew's went on to win all of its 10 matches during the 1886 season and became "premier club and the winners of the association badges."

The third annual meeting of the AQFA in May 1887 reported overall results for six clubs in the 1886 season (although, apparently, not all were participating in the AQFA competition): the original three (Queen's Park, Rangers and St. Andrew's), together with Swifts (Brisbane), Bundamba Rovers, and Queenslanders (both of Ipswich). Matches between Brisbane and Ipswich teams were made possible by the Brisbane to Ipswich railway line, which had opened in 1876 (Ipswich, about 40 kilometres south-west of Brisbane, was where many Welsh and northern English coal miners had settled from the mid-nineteenth century onwards). The Thistle Football Club, a breakaway group from the St Andrew's club, joined the competition in 1887 and went on to win the AQFA Cup final the following year, defeating Bundanba (later 'Bundamba') Rovers 4-1 at the "Five Ways, Woolloongabba [now the Brisbane Cricket Ground]. In front of 300 spectators ...".

=== The battle of the Codes ===
However, and unfortunately for the progress of the Association game, the Northern Rugby Union (NRU) was also formed in 1884, as a breakaway from the Queensland Football Association (the body which administered both Victorian rules and rugby at that time). Within two years, the NRU competition had six teams and, according to one writer, "The defining moment in the code battle came with the 1886 Queensland [Rugby] side, who defeated NSW for the first time in Sydney. "The success of this team undoubtedly won the day for rugby game in Queensland. The Victorian game supporters were struggling hard to uphold the premier position they had gained but after the brilliant performance of the 1886 team, who lost only one match through their tour, the rugby game became very popular and the next season several new clubs were formed and the Victorian game began to wane". Inspired by this performance, schools started to change to Rugby and by 1887 the NRU boasted 25 clubs.

Toward the end of the 1880s, a newspaper reported regarding the state of football in the colony: "Rugby, an unbounded success; Melbourne rules very sick indeed, in fact on their last legs; British Association Rules, also in a sickly state but if anything showing more life than the Victorian game." At the QRU annual meeting in 1894, it was asserted that "the football game of Queensland was undoubtedly rugby. There were no signs that any other game was likely to become so popular as it." (that the amateur rugby code would be disbanded within a generation would have been beyond their comprehension - see 'The Great War years' below). All of the three original football clubs (Queen's Park, St Andrew's and Rangers) appeared to have folded by the early twentieth century, as there are no known records of their existence beyond the early 1920s.

== 1890s: Ipswich dominance commences ==
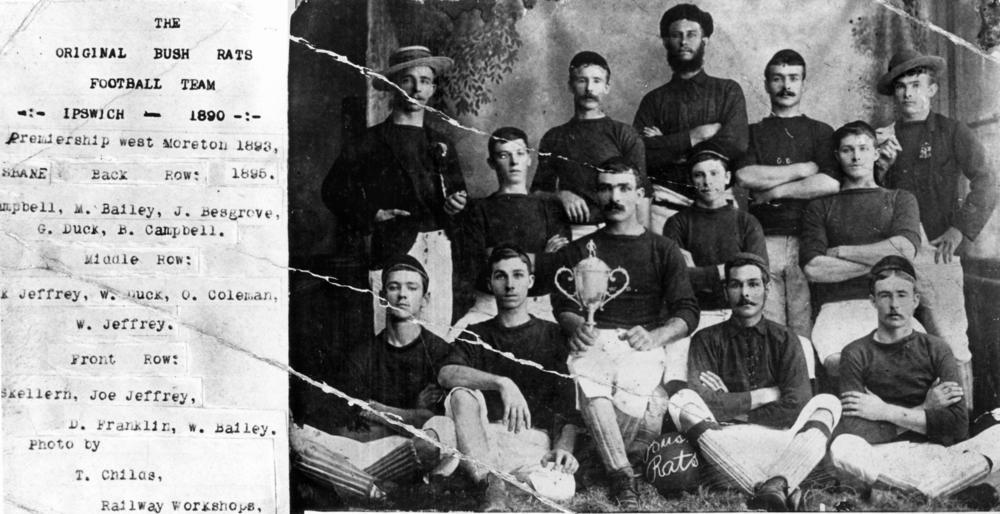
The Bush Rats team of 1890 posing with a trophy

=== The Queensland British Football Association ===
Perhaps in deference to the large numbers of Scottish and Welsh migrants playing the game locally, the AQFA re-formed as the Queensland British Football Association (QBFA), at the annual meeting of "the clubs in Brisbane and Ipswich playing under the British Football Association rules ...", held in April 1890.

=== First inter-colonial matches ===
In August 1890, a Queensland team was sent to play "intercolonial" matches against the New South Wales association. Queensland defeated NSW 3-1 and 1-0, as well as playing a match at Newcastle. Overall, the Queensland team "scored ten goals and lost three" on this tour.

=== Ipswich teams join the competition ===
At a general meeting of the QBFA held at the Shamrock Hotel in Fortitude Valley in early 1891, it was reported that "The association is to be strengthened this year by the addition of three clubs from the Ipswich district, besides others from Brisbane." The names of those teams are not recorded, but were likely to have included Bundamba Rangers, Blackstone Rovers and the Bush Rats. The Bundamba Rangers went on to win 'the badges' in 1895 (see photograph) and the Bush Rats team then won several premierships in the late 1890s and early 1900s. This was the beginning of a dominance of the Brisbane/Ipswich competition by Ipswich teams that was to last until the mid-20th century, with Ipswich teams winning a disproportionate number of premierships and producing many State and Australian players. However, by 1896, the competition had dwindled to four teams: Normans, Rangers, Rosebank and the newly formed Ipswich Rovers. Notwithstanding this, 1200 spectators attended the semi-final of the Charity Cup at Queen's Park, to see Rosebank defeat Rangers 1-0. Rovers won the Challenge Cup (the premiership) and the Charity Cup (defeating Rosebank 3-2 at the "Association Ground, Bowen Bridge Road"). 1896 also saw the introduction of a junior competition.

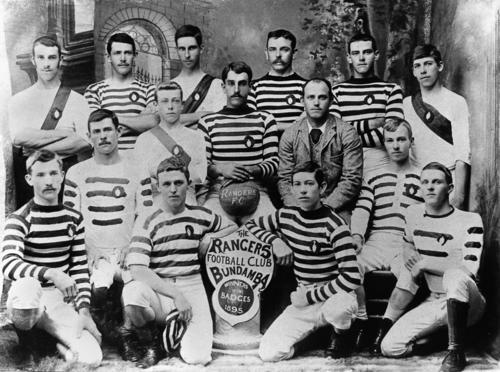
Bundamba Rangers F.C. posing in 1895

The Ipswich clubs' success may be attributed to a number of reasons: Ipswich "enjoyed prosperity during the boom of the 1880s ... there was remarkable growth of mining ... [and] miners swelled the population of the Ipswich area." Many of these miners had emigrated from Great Britain, where they would have experienced the enormous growth of professional association football there in the late nineteenth century. The Ipswich colliery owners also encouraged the growth of football: "Ebbw Vale Memorial Park was first known as the Whitwood ground, as in the early 1890s the owners of the Whitwood Colliery made the land available for their employees to use as a football ground ... Several collieries had football teams formed by miners including Stafford brothers at Dinmore, Wright's at Tivoli and Lewis Thomas at Blackstone."

The game in Ipswich did not have the same level of competition for players as there was in Brisbane from the other established football codes: it was reported in 1898 that "The [Association] game has recently taken a strong hold here [Ipswich], especially since Ipswich has been unable to muster a senior Rugby team. It also has a big following at Blackstone, Bundamba, Dinmore,&c ...". As well as these factors, it is likely there was a fierce rivalry with Brisbane, particularly as the latter town had become the capital of Queensland ahead of Ipswich in 1859. Towards the end of the 1899 season, a match between South Brisbane and the ultimate Premiers, Bush Rats, was played at the "Rugby Union Ground, Bowen Bridge Road ... Admission Sixpence; Ladies free" (the result is not recorded).

=== Ipswich teams withdraw ===
By the late 1890s, the 'Ipswich and West Moreton' clubs were becoming discontented with their treatment by the QBFA, particularly as, according to one report, there were three strong clubs in Ipswich (Blackstone, Bundamba and Dinmore) and only two Brisbane clubs in the competition at that time (the two clubs are not named, but were likely to be South Brisbane and Thistle). Subsequently, the Ipswich and West Moreton British Football Association was formed and those teams withdrew from the QBFA competition, with the powerful Bush Rats team defeating Blackstone Rovers 3-0 for the 1900 Ipswich Association premiership. This was the first of several disruptions by disaffected groups that hampered the growth of the game in Brisbane during the course of the twentieth century.

With the Association game in turmoil, the strength of the Rugby code in Brisbane was demonstrated when England played Australia at the Brisbane Exhibition Ground in 1899 in front of about 15,000 people, the largest sporting crowd ever witnessed in the colony. Unfortunately for the home team, the visitors won 11-0.

== 1900s: Brisbane competition in decline ==
The Brisbane game suffered as a result of Ipswich's withdrawal, as noted at the annual meeting of the Ipswich Association in early 1901: "The president (Mr. E.G. Morgan) referred with regret to the poor state of the association game in the metropolis [Brisbane], and suggested that overtures be made to the Queensland Association with a view to taking over the Challenge and Charity Cups, and offering the same for competition, until a revival of the game in Brisbane warrants the resumption of regular fixtures there." Further evidence of the decline in the Brisbane game is provided by a newspaper report that only two Brisbane teams (Thistles and the newly formed Rovers) had nominated for the 1900 Challenge Cup against Ipswich teams.

The Brisbane Courier also reported that the annual meeting of the QBFA in March 1903 had to be postponed, as "less than a dozen members put in an appearance, and most of these belonged to the one club". The meeting was held in April and decided that "the association should make some special effort to place the game on a better footing than at present." It was also noted that "Arrangements are also to be made to secure the Botanic Gardens for playing. It was decided that a letter be sent to Mr. E. Donegan [presumably the publican of the Pineapple Hotel], thanking him for the use of the Pineapple ground."

=== Ipswich clubs rejoin ===
The opening match of the 1903 season saw Cities defeat Stars 7-1 at the 'Pineapple-paddock'. Despite the difficulties of the previous years, the Ipswich clubs rejoined the QBFA in 1903, with the Bush Rats winning the senior final of that competition, defeating Royals (of North Ipswich) 1-0 at the Reliance Ground, Dinmore. Other teams playing that season included Eskgroves (Brisbane), Milton, Wellingtons and Reliance (Ipswich). However, the game was still unsettled - the following year (1904) saw some of those teams not re-entering competition (the competition comprised eight teams: Blackstone Rovers A, Blackstone Rovers B, Bush Rats, Market, Milton, Norman Park, Rangers and Reliance).

The opening game of the 1907 season between Milton and Dinmore at Gregory Park (which Dinmore won 4-1), saw goal nets used for the first time in Brisbane. It was also around 1907 that association football is referred to as 'soccer' in local newspapers for the first time (the term is widely considered to be Oxford University slang dating from the 1890s). The local game continued to be referred to as 'soccer' or 'soccer football' for almost 100 years, until the newly formed Football Federation Australia began calling the sport 'football' in 2005.

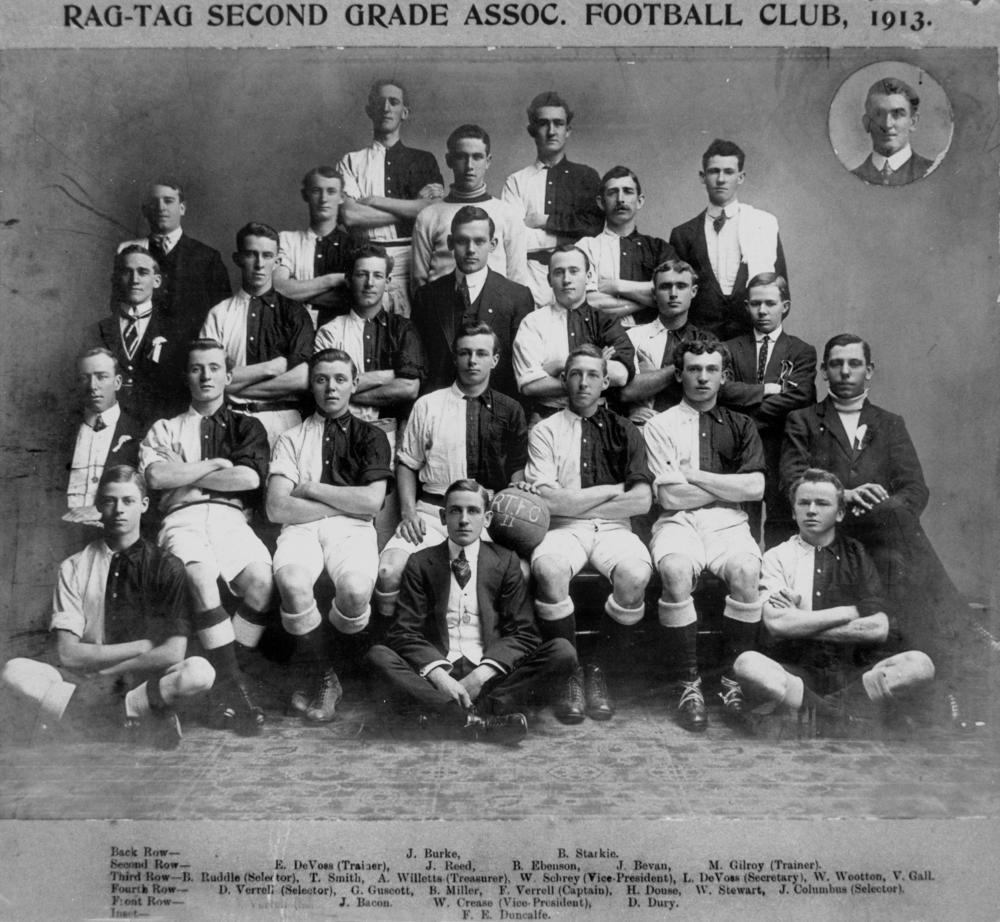
Rag-tag Second Grade Association Football Club 1913

The game continued to struggle during this decade, with only five senior clubs affiliated in 1909, increasing to seven senior and nine junior clubs in 1910. At the annual meeting of the QBFA in September 1910, the secretary reported that the association was "without doubt, the strongest association that had existed for some considerable time." Australian Rules football appeared to be faring little better in Brisbane around this time, as the Ipswich A Grade side beat Brisbane 102 points to 1. It was also 1909 that saw the inaugural Brisbane Rugby League competition, with that game ultimately becoming the dominant code in Brisbane (see below).

By 1912, the game was growing again as that season featured at least three grades, including teams such as Albion (probably playing at the 'Albion Flats' - likely to be the present Allan Border Field), Blackstone Rovers (the eventual Premiers), Bulimba Rangers (1911 Premiers, played at what is now Memorial Park, Bulimba), Bush Rats (Dinmore), Eskgrove (possibly Mowbray Park, East Brisbane), Pineapple Rovers (Raymond Park, Kangaroo Point), Red Rovers, Rebels (Dunn's Paddock, Kangaroo Point) and Shafston Rovers (Raymond Park).

A newspaper report for the 1913 season noted that a "record number of teams have entered for the various competitions". The First Division teams were Albion, Australian Meat Works, Bulimba Rangers, Corinthians, Eskgrove, Toowong, Wellington and YMCA, and there were nine teams in the Second Division (it appears that no Ipswich teams entered the Brisbane competition in that season). The opening match of the season was held at the Brisbane Cricket Ground, "before one of the biggest attendances which a club "soccer" match has had in Brisbane", where Wellingtons defeated Bulimba Rangers 1-0. The reporter noted that "There was a little combination work, which was very pretty, but for the most part the play was very ladylike. Almost every time the ball was kicked it seemed to go out." The 1913 Premiership was won by Bulimba Rangers.

The only extant club from this era is Oxley United FC, founded in 1912.

== The Great War years ==
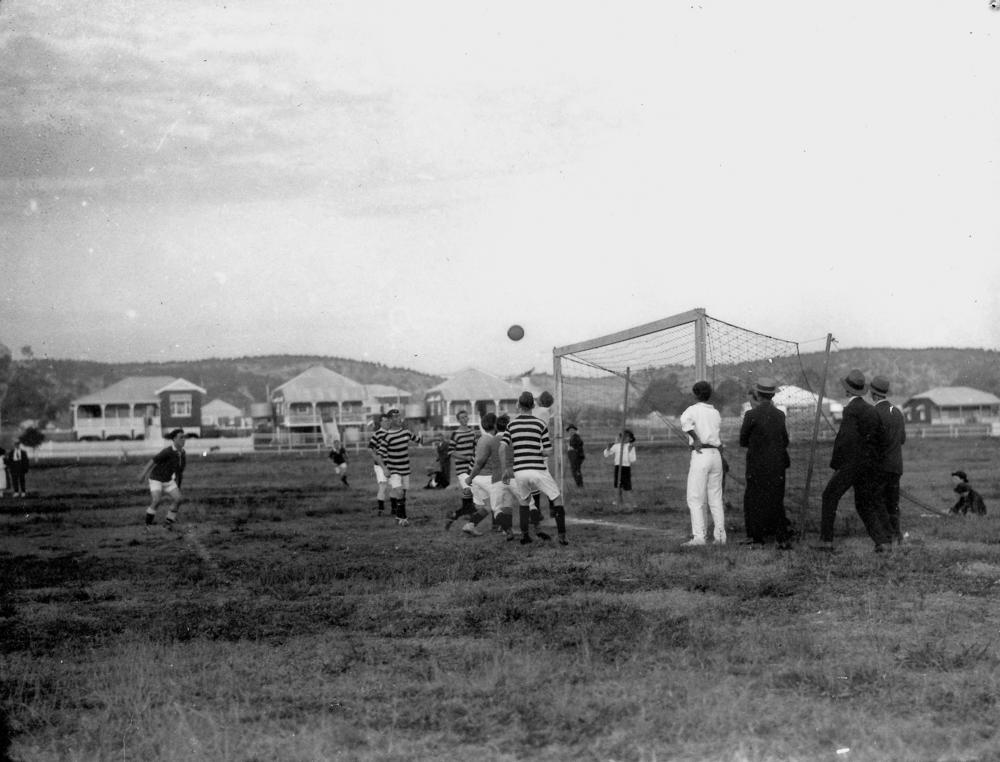
Shot for goal in a soccer match, Brisbane, ca. 1914 (at the ground now known as Memorial Park, Bulimba)

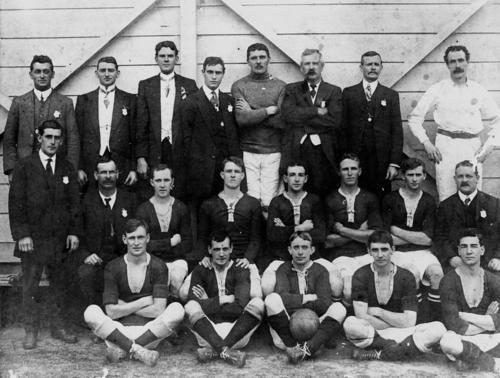
Ipswich team, 1914

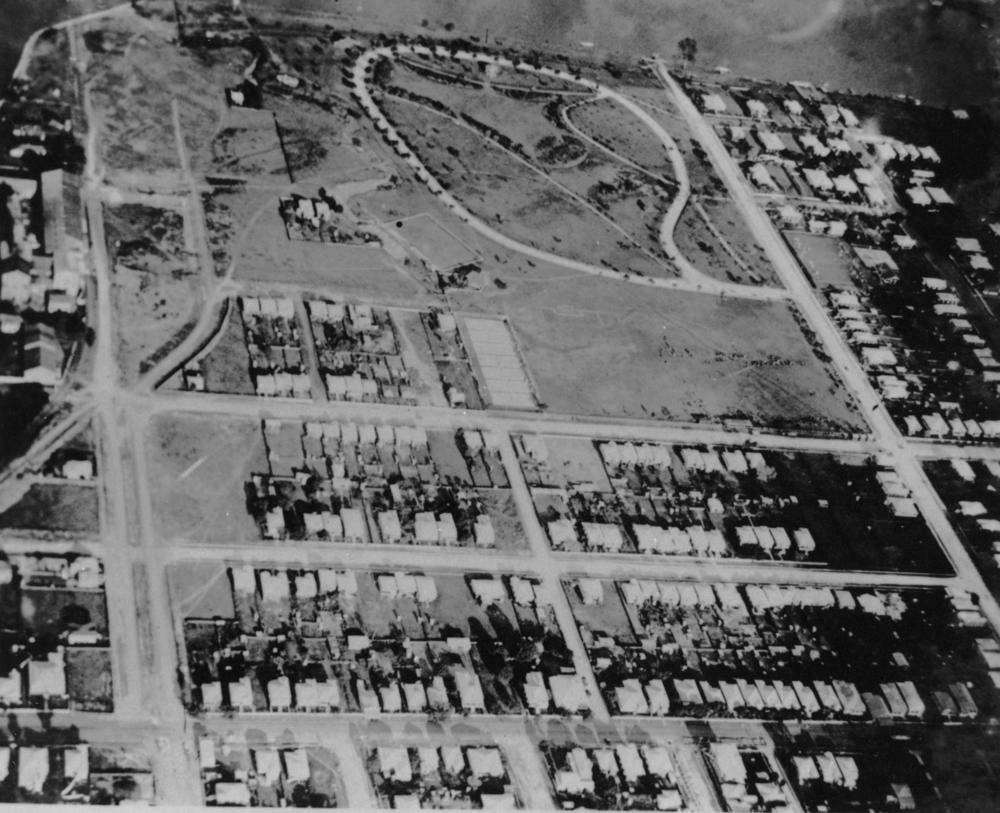
New Farm Park ca 1925: Football field shown at centre right of image

=== Commonwealth Football Association ===
Brisbane hosted the second annual meeting of the Commonwealth Football Association at the Grosvenor Hotel in April 1914. Amongst other things, the meeting resolved "Regarding the Olympic Games at Berlin in 1916, the congress strongly recommended each State to co-operate with the various local Olympic Committees, with a view to representation at Berlin." This, of course, was not to be, with the beginning of World War I in Europe just two months later.

=== Ipswich clubs withdraw again ===
Once again it appears that the Ipswich clubs decided to break away from the Brisbane competition - a letter to the editor from 'Lancashire Lad' in 1914 lamented that "It is a pity the Ipswich and district clubs found it necessary to break away from the Brisbane competition, for we have much to learn from our West Moreton footballers-especially I may say, in the matter of enthusiasm for the game." However, by 1914, the game had become so popular in Brisbane that "Soccer devotees attended in their thousands at the Albion Flats", to watch Ipswich defeat Brisbane 2-1. The Ipswich team included players from Booval, Bush Rats, Goodna, Ipswich City, Bundamba Rangers and St Stephen's. The Brisbane players' clubs are not recorded. The Queensland team chosen after this match went on to play New South Wales and either won 3-2 or lost 6-2, according to conflicting newspaper reports. The Ipswich and West Moreton competition was clearly very strong at this time, as their representative team defeated the New South Wales team 4-1.

The 1915 season featured at least fourteen teams: Ashley, Balmoral (Bulimba), Brisbane City I and II (Albion), Bulimba Rangers, Ellenas (Rosalie, probably Gregory Park), Goodna, Ipswich City, Merthyr Thistle, Merton Rovers, Pineapple Rovers I and II, Toowong Caledonians and Wallaby (Hendra). The first grade senior competition was won by Merthyr Thistle (probably based at New Farm Park) and the second grade by Brisbane City II. The Challenge Cup was won by Corinthians (named after the famous English amateur football team) and the Charity Cup by Brisbane City I. 1915 also saw reporting of junior competitions: winners' trophies were presented to the "first grade junior, Rag Tag Club, second grade junior, Brisbane City II; third grade junior, Wallaby I".

=== Competition suspended ===
The annual meeting of the QBFA in early 1916 reported that "31 clubs played in the various competitions last season, comprising over 600 registered players." The meeting also passed a resolution "That no competition be held in the Senior, First or Second Grade competitions and that no player of military age be allowed to take part in a lower competition ... [but] clubs ... should be allowed to play friendly matches." Despite this, as well as matches between and against Services teams, newspapers also reported club matches between Milton, Technical College, Natives, Ellenas, Park Church, Balmoral, Starlight and Torwood.

The resumption of fixtures in 1917 saw around thirty teams contesting QBFA competitions over at least three divisions: Amblers (or Ramblers?), Astley (or Ashley) Rovers, Bulimba, Chermside, Excelsiors (New Farm Park), Holy Cross, Imperial Boy Scouts, Junction Park Royals, Kangaroos (Pineapple Ground, Kangaroo Point), King's Own, Kurilpa Rovers, Latrobe (Milton), Mallina (Milton), Mayne (Mayne Estate), Merthyr Thistle (New Farm), Milton Scouts, Natives (Yeronga Park), New Farm, Nundah, Park Church (Musgrave Park, South Brisbane), Ellenas, St Philip's, Technical College (Raymond Park, Kangaroo Point), Toowong Starlights (Land's Paddock, Toowong), Torwood Natives, Twilights, Wallabies, Wellington Rovers and White Stars (Nundah). St Ellena [sic] and Latrobe contested the Third grade Premiership final at Gregory Park Milton, with St Ellena [sic] winning 1-0 (Latrobe is the only remaining Brisbane club in continuous existence from that 1917 season - now Bardon Latrobe at Bowman Park Bardon, after a series of mergers).

The 1918 season showed that the so-called 'Association game' was in a state of flux, with the competition being contested by at least 22 Brisbane teams, many of which were from new clubs (it is unclear whether the competition included separate 'divisions'). The competition included Celtic (Junction Park), Ellenas (Gregory Park, Milton), Excelsior (New Farm), Fairfield (Yeronga), Kalinga (Hendra), Kurilpa (Musgrave Park, South Brisbane), Latrobe (Milton), Natives (Raymond Park, Kangaroo Point), Oxley (Ramblers?), Park Church, Pineapple A (Pineapple Sportsground, Kangaroo Point), Pineapple B (Raymond Park), Ramblers (possibly Oxley Ramblers), Red Rovers, Rangers (Junction Park), Rebels (Milton), Royals, St Philip's, Violets (Musgrave Park), Wanderers, Wallabies and Wellington (Pineapple Sportsground). There was significant ground sharing by a number of clubs (e.g., at least four clubs at Pineapple/Raymond Park and at least three clubs at Milton). During the Great War the Ipswich teams once again did not play in the QBFA Brisbane competition, with at least some of those teams re-joining by the 1921 season (as noted below).

By 1919, the men's competition comprised four grades: 'Senior' (with five teams - Bulimba Rangers, Ellena, Eskgrove, Merthyr Thistle and Pineapple Rovers), 'Second' (eight teams), 'Third' Divisions A (eight teams) and B (six teams). The semi-finals that season were played at the Exhibition Ground: Merthyrs played Latrobe in the Third Grade semi-final, at 1.35, Pineapple Rovers played St Barnabas in the Second Grade at 2.40 and Bulimba Rangers played Pineapple Rovers in the First Grade at 3.45. Each match was no more than one hour long. Pineapple Rovers were the eventual First Grade Premiers, defeating Merthyr Thistle 3-1 at the Brisbane Cricket Ground.

== 1920s: The game grows - then falters ==
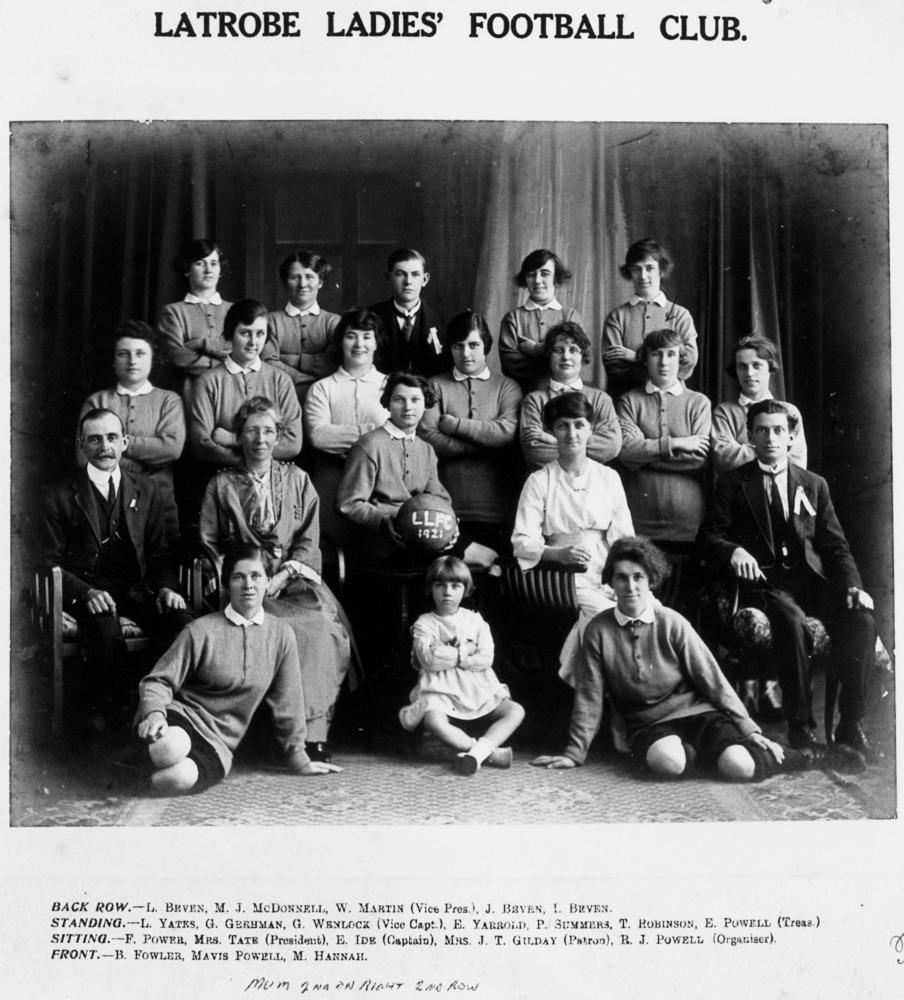
Latrobe Ladies 1921

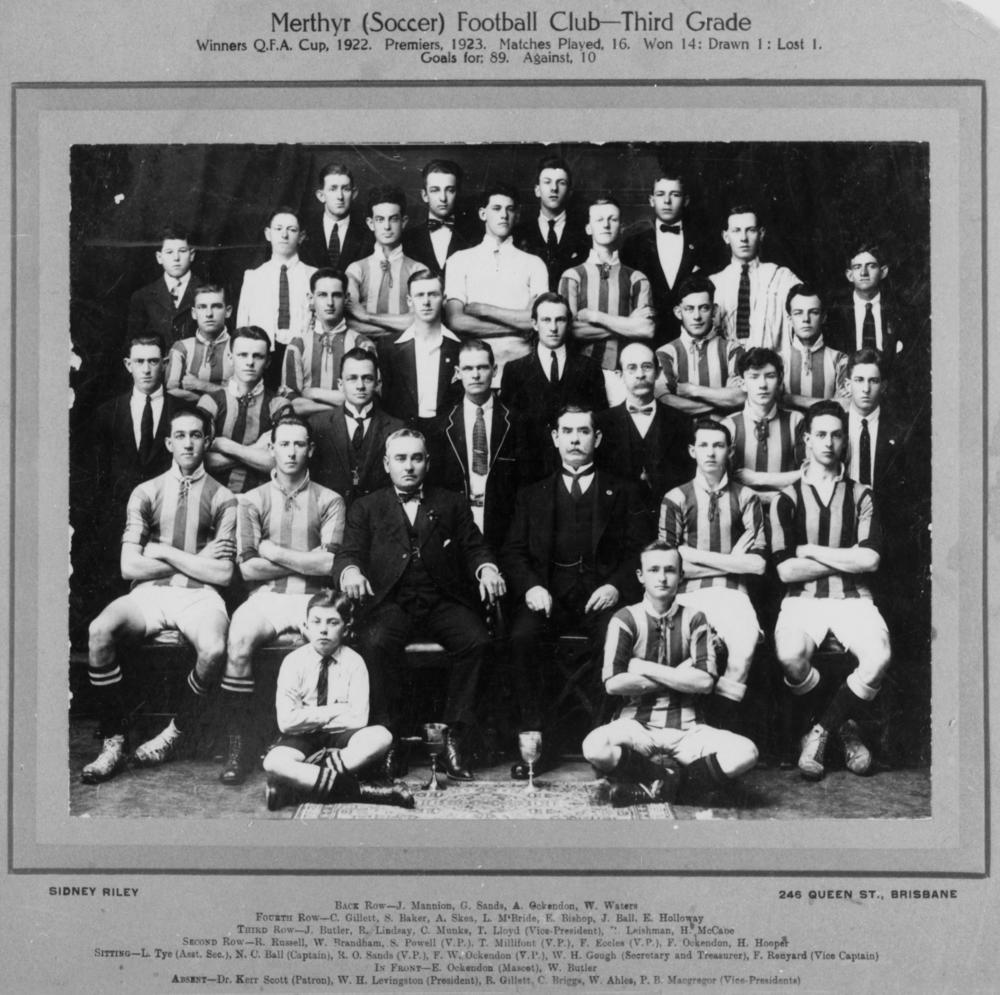
Merthyr Premiers Third Grade 1923

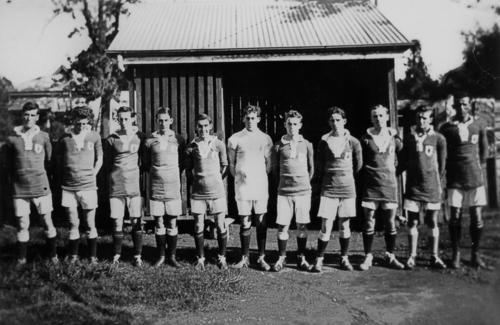
Pineapple Rovers ca 1924

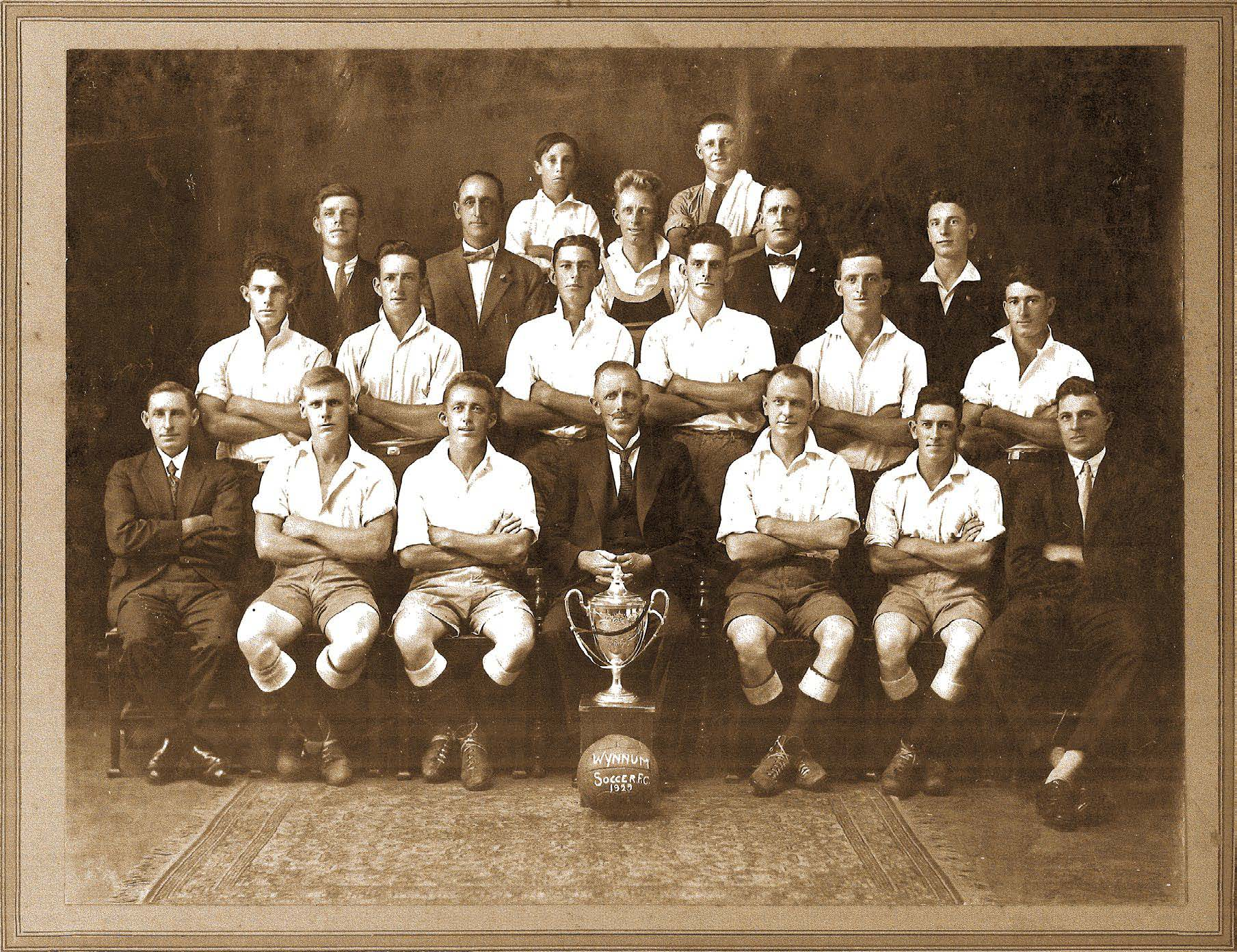
Wynnum Soccer Football Club 1929

=== Rugby League becomes the dominant Code in Brisbane ===
The 1920s decade was pivotal for the development of all of the football codes in Brisbane, where Rugby Union had been the dominant code since the mid-1880s. According to the official Queensland Rugby Union history, after the advent of Rugby League in Brisbane in 1908, "[R]ugby union took a downturn in Queensland.... The effect of league developing, compounded with the First World War, was immediate and strong with major clubs and the GPS schools all changing to [Rugby] league [in 1918], which effectively led to the disbandment of the Queensland Rugby Union in 1919." The Rugby Union did not re-form until 1928, but by this time Rugby League had become the dominant football code in Brisbane (likely assisted by the apparent turmoil in the Association game at the time, as described below), a situation that exists to this day.

=== The Queensland Football Association ===
By 1920, the QBFA had dropped 'British' from its name and was now known simply as the 'Queensland Football Association' (QFA), and now based at the Brisbane Cricket Ground. As noted below, Ipswich teams had also rejoined the Brisbane competition. The 1921 QFA season saw eight teams in the First Grade: Brisbane City, Bundamba, Corinthians, Bush Rats, Pineapple Rovers, South Brisbane, Thistle and Wynnum. Wynnum (now Wynnum Wolves F.C.) was both formed and made its first-grade debut that year. The Second and Third Grade competitions included teams such as Caledonians, Glenallen, Kangaroos, Latrobe, Merthyr, Nundah, Ovals, Rovers, Triangles, Toowong Cadets, Violets and Wilstons.

This decade was also dominated by Ipswich teams, which finished top of the table in six of the nine premierships they contested (but not always winning the premiership, which during that era was sometimes decided by playoffs): Bundamba Rangers three times (and runners-up three times), Bush Rats twice and Blackstone Rovers once

=== Ladies competition formed ===
Another notable event in 1921 was the formation of the Queensland Ladies Soccer Football Association, at a meeting held in the Brisbane Gymnasium, at which "about 100 ladies were present." It appears that three clubs were formed and played 'friendly' matches during the season: Latrobe Ladies (see photo), North Brisbane and South Brisbane. Remarkably, about 10,000 spectators attended at the Brisbane Cricket Ground in September 1921, to see North Brisbane defeat South Brisbane 2-0 in their first game. The annual meeting of the association in 1922 expressed the desire to commence regular fixtures during the forthcoming season with "about half a dozen teams". However, apart from a practice match between the 'Brisbane City' and 'Brisbane Ladies' clubs at Bowen Park in June 1922 (which City won 12-0), there are no known records of the progress of this association after that time.

=== The game grows ===
The 1923 senior competition comprised three divisions, including the following clubs: First - Brisbane City, Bundamba Rangers, Bush Rats, Corinthians, Pineapple Rovers and Thistle; Second - Blackstone, Bundamba Athletic, Bundamba United, Dinmore Wanderers, Latrobe, South Brisbane Scottish, Wilston and Wynnum; Third - Brisbane Gymnasium, Bulimba, Caledonians, Kedron United, Merthyr, Metropolitan Fire Brigade, Natives, Mitchelton, Toombul United and Waterside Workers. However, the 1923 season was a troubled one: Bush Rats withdrew from the competition, alleging "that no matter what suggestions were made by them to the association they never got any real consideration." The season also saw many on-field disturbances (foul and abusive language, fighting, and ungentlemanly conduct), officials suspended and a Natives FC supporter deliberately breaking a window at the Toombul club.

1925 was potentially a pivotal year for the local game, when the Queensland representative team "deprived New South Wales of the Soccer ashes for the first time since 1890", with a 2-0 defeat at the (Gabba) Cricket Ground (at that time, the 'headquarters' of the game). The Queensland team comprised Halls (goalkeeper, Blackstone Rovers), Viertel (Pineapple Rovers) and Traynor, Williams (captain, Blackstone Rovers), Marshall (Pineapple Rovers) and Raffino, Edwards, Steele, May, Kyle (both Thistle) and Stone. When proposing a toast, the Minister for Works, Mr J Kirwan, said "the New South Wales visit had given the game the necessary stimulus in Queensland and the executive officers controlling the Queensland Association now looked forward to continued success. Each year should see the game increase in popularity." Unfortunately, as noted below, this was not to be.

=== Brisbane and District Football Association ===
1928 saw the formation of the Brisbane and District Football Association (BDFA), replacing the QFA. For that year, the league had two divisions: the First Division comprising nine teams (Bundamba, Blackstone, Brisbane City, Dinmore Bush Rats (possibly after a merger between Dinmore Wanderers and Bush Rats), Latrobe, Norman Park, Pineapple Rovers, Thistle and Wynnum) and the Second Division ten teams (Bulimba, Ipswich Railway, Kedron, Merton Rovers, Milton, St Helens, Thistle, Toombul, Toowong and Wilston). The Premiership for that year was won by Bundamba Rangers (their second in a row), with Latrobe winning the Moore Cup 1-0 over Norman Park and Bush Rats the Tristram Shield, 2-1 over Thistle. In the same year, a "strong Queensland XI" was selected to "avenge the narrow defeat inflicted on the maroons by New South Wales last Saturday." The goalkeeper was from Blackstone, the two fullbacks Norman Park and Pineapple Rovers, the three halfbacks from Latrobe and Pineapple Rovers, the five forwards from Blackstone, Bundamba, Latrobe, Pineapple Rovers (at that time, teams played the so-called 'M-W' formation).

However, at least one report from the late 1920s declared that the local game was struggling: "Little wonder, therefore, that many who agreed with the booting out of the old governing body, now are patiently waiting for the new controllers to gracefully retire from the arena. The first season of the Brisbane and District League looks like proving a dismal failure." This state of affairs, presumably, led to breakaway groups (see below).

=== Ipswich teams withdraw ===
Matters deteriorated in 1929, when the three Ipswich clubs (Bundamba Rangers, Dinmore Bush Rats and St Helens) withdrew from the semi-final round, leaving only Brisbane club Latrobe. The reason given in a newspaper report was "because they were not allowed to share the profits of the matches which were to have been played at the Cricket Ground." However, the report also noted "they were parties to the original arrangement ... The four Brisbane clubs alone are responsible for the rent of the Brisbane Cricket Ground, and these semi-finals were to help liquidate the liability." Another report said "the whole future of the game in this State is in the melting pot. To put the matter bluntly, the Brisbane clubs are fed up with these incessant rows with Ipswich, and desire to end the business once and for all ..." The Ipswich clubs were fined and suspended and, despite attempts at mediation, were not included in the Brisbane competition for 1930 (see below). With the departure of the Ipswich clubs, Latrobe became the dominant team of the late 1920s and early 1930s, winning six of the seven Premierships between 1929 and 1935.

== 1930s: Decade of disunity ==
=== Queensland Soccer Association ===
The newly formed Queensland Soccer Association (QSA) directed the formation of a First Division for the 1930 season comprising eight Brisbane clubs, each required to field a reserve grade team. The Thistle club elected to compete in the Ipswich competition, leaving three First Division clubs (Latrobe-Milton, Pineapple Rovers and Norman Park) and five newly promoted Second Division clubs (Bulimba, Wynnum, Toowong, Toombul and YMCA). Matches were to be played at the Brisbane Cricket Ground, Memorial Park (Wynnum), Pineapple Paddock (Kangaroo Point), Nundah Sports Ground, Toowong, Lang Park (Milton) and Kalinga. The 1930 Premiership was won by Latrobe after their 1-0 defeat of the Pineapple Rovers, in a game described as "one of the best witnessed at headquarters this season ...".

By 1934 season, the game appears to have dwindled: the First Division now comprised eight teams (Latrobe and Milton (both at Gregory Park, Milton), Pineapple Rovers, Shafston Rovers (both Raymond Park, Kangaroo Point), Toombul (Nundah), Toowong, Wynnum and YMCA), and the Second Division only six teams (Merton Rovers, Milton, St Oswalds, Toombul, Wynnum and YMCA).

=== Soccer leases Lang Park ===
In 1935, the Queensland Soccer Council (QSC) had taken over the lease of Lang Park as its home ground, with a view to using it as the home ground for BDFA fixtures (and thus leaving the Brisbane Cricket Ground). Latrobe became a sub-tenant, using the ground for its home games. In 1936, the Brisbane competition had remained steady in size, with the First Division still comprising eight teams: Latrobe and Milton (Lang Park), Merton Rovers, Shafston Rovers, Toombul United (Nundah), United Rangers (playing at Raymond Park No 2 field, Kangaroo Point) Wynnum and YMCA (ultimate Premiers); the Second Division six teams: Corinthians (Raymond Park No 1), Merton Rovers (Yeronga Park), Pineapple Rovers, Redfern United (Lanham Park, Grange), Toombul United and YMCA.

=== Ipswich teams rejoin the competition ===
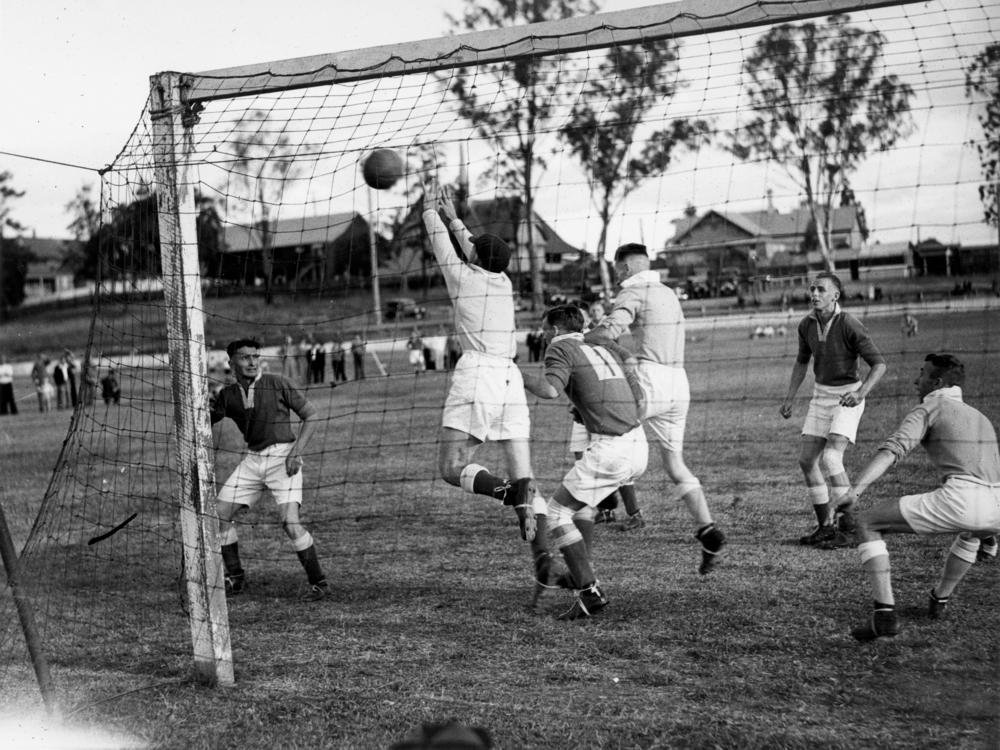
1937 soccer match at Lang Park Milton, looking towards Milton Road - Latrobe (in dark strip) hosting Bundamba Rangers

However, by 1937, the QSC was considering sub-leasing Lang Park to "another code of football" (most likely Western Suburbs Rugby League) as it "was not satisfied with the financial returns ... under the sub-lease to the Latrobe-Milton club". Latrobe in turn responded that "'If no action Is taken to introduce the Ipswich clubs into the Brisbane competition this' season ... the Latrobe-Milton Club cannot accept an increase in rental for Lang Park. Give us competition play with Ipswich and my club will hold the ground as headquarters for the code."

The matter was resolved after much negotiation between the QSC and the tenant clubs, which could explain the QSC's decision to merge the Brisbane and Ipswich associations for the 1937 season, when the Ipswich and Brisbane teams resumed competition together for the first time since 1929. Bundamba Rangers won the 1937 Premiership (as well as those for 1938 and 1939). The season saw fourteen teams contesting the title: Booval, Brothers, Corinthians, Bundamba Rangers, Latrobe, Merton Rovers (Yeronga Park), Milton, Oxley Ramblers, Rosewood, Shafston Rovers (Raymond Park), St Helens (Ebbw Vale), Toombul United (Nundah), United Rangers and YMCA (Kalinga). The Second Division included Blackstone Rovers, Kookaburras, Merton Rovers, Redfern United, Toombul United, Wynnum and Y.M.C.A. As noted above, Bundamba won the First Division and were presented with the Tristram Cup. Blackstone Rovers won all competitions for the Second Division and were presented with the G.H. Price, Nissen and Tedman Cups.

Notwithstanding the apparent strength of the game, G. R. Tainton, a former secretary of the QFA, declared in July 1937 that "Soccer football nowadays is not the buoyant force in Brisbane sport it was a decade ago ... [However] the English amateur team's visit to Brisbane next week is bound to interest thousands who would otherwise not give it more than a passing thought. It is doubtful, however, whether the English amateurs will prove the same draw in Brisbane as the English professional team of 1925." In the same article, Tainton also commented that "Professionalism, of course, is not unknown to Brisbane Soccer. The now defunct Norman Park Club once tried the experiment of payment for players. The scale was 10/- [ten shillings, or half a 'pound' - at that time, the average weekly earnings for a factory worker were less than £5 (five pounds) a week] for a win and 5/- for a defeat, but financial difficulties soon ended an innovation many years before its time. Professional football and club solvency cannot go hand in hand without finance – and that means big 'gates.' When players like Park, Kyle, May, and McGovern were 'starring' for Thistle, 10 years ago, a £50 [fifty pounds - approximately $3,500 in 2010] 'gate' was not uncommon at the Brisbane Cricket Ground, the then headquarters of the code."

=== Signs of dissent ===
Despite what was described as a successful 1937 season, all was not well in the soccer community, with four senior club officials suspended over the issue of a circular stating "[T]hat there would be a general discussion of Soccer management," with the "idea of Soccer football being governed in a different manner than is at present the case." The secretary of the BDFA advised in late 1937 "[T]hat a grave crisis is likely to arise in the Brisbane area under its control, by reason of dissension among certain club officials ... [E]very effort must be made to prevent Soccer football from falling into the state of disruption which existed some few years ago." However, at that season's end, the Courier Mail reported that the president of the QSC (Mr W. Elson Green) "claimed that the growth in popularity of the code during last season was such that an independent analysis of attendances at club games would, reveal numbers that excelled that of Rugby Union and approached Rugby League." More change occurred for the 1938 season, with the First Division comprising only ten teams: Booval, Christian Brothers, Bundamba Rovers, Corinthians, Evans Deakin, Latrobe, Oxley, Pineapple Rovers, Shafston Rovers and St Helens.

The only known extant (or descendant) clubs from the 1930s Brisbane competitions are Bundamba and St Helens (merged to form Ipswich Knights), Latrobe (merged as Bardon Latrobe), Merton Rovers (merged with Eastern Suburbs), Pineapple Rovers (revived, then renamed Kangaroo Point Rovers FC), Toowong (revived as Toowong FC), Oxley Ramblers (now Oxley United F.C.) and Wynnum (now Wynnum Wolves F.C.).

== World War II years: Semi-professionalism surfaces ==
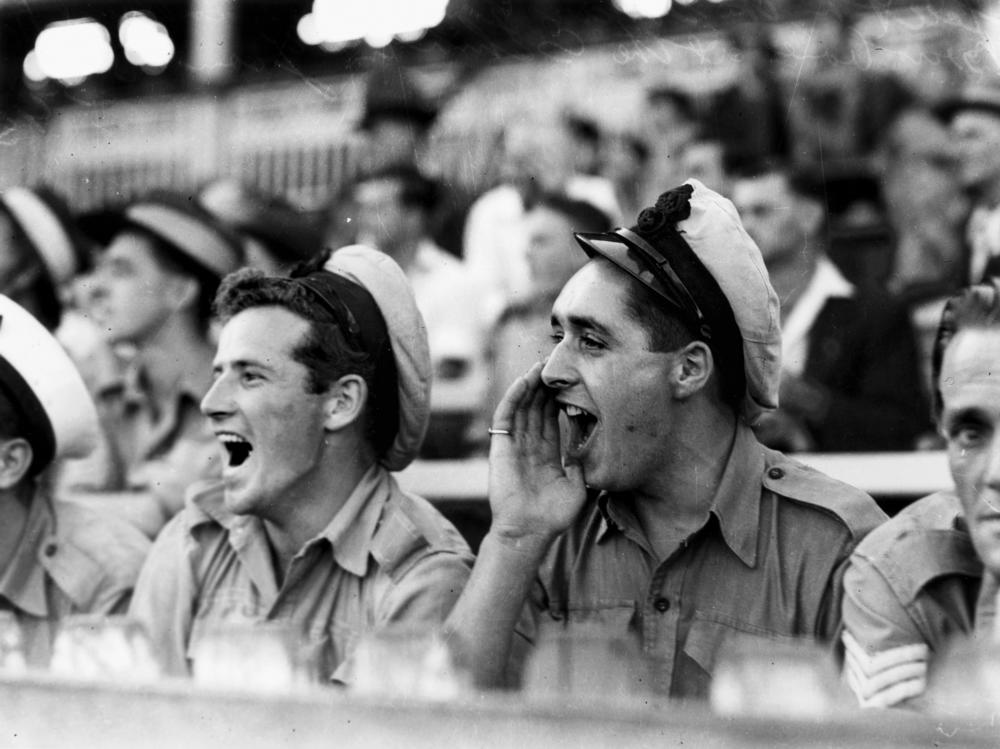
Navy men cheering for their soccer team, Brisbane, March 1945

For the 1940 season, there was further change, with a proposal for the establishment of a 'district' competition (which was not ultimately adopted). That year also saw the formation of the Queensland Soccer Football Association (QSFA) and more problems for the game: the major Ipswich clubs (Blackstone, Booval Stars, Bundamba Rangers and St. Helens) initially decided not to affiliate with the QSFA, as they considered it was "unconstitutional". Despite this, they decided this would not "break up any likely conference with the A grade clubs of Brisbane" The Ipswich teams, with the exception of St Helens, ultimately joined the Brisbane competition for that year, with some of the St Helens players joining Brisbane clubs to continue their playing careers. Latrobe boasted "four international players", including two former Bundamba players, which suggests that Latrobe (if not other clubs as well) was operating on a semi-professional basis, in order to attract players from relatively distant locations (despite this being 'illegal' under the QSFA rules - see 'Post-war to 1960s' below). A newspaper article in 1940 appears to confirm this by reporting criticism of "certain first division clubs ... [which] continued to offer inducements to [younger] players to leave the club ..." (whilst there is no known evidence, the experiences of other football codes and competitions suggest it is likely that 'illegal' payments (often referred to as boot money)' were paid to players from early days of the competitions).

The teams for the 1940 season included Blackstone, Booval, Bundamba, Corinthians, Easts, Latrobe, Wynnum and YMCA. Notwithstanding Latrobe's strong squad, Corinthians went on to win the Premiership (see 'Premiers and Cup winners' below).

=== Soccer competitions suspended ===
After the 1941 season, in which the Premiership was won by Blackstone Rovers (see 'Premiers and Cup winners' below), the competition was suspended (the only major games played were fixtures and friendlies between servicemen's teams, as well as teams formed from groups who stayed in Australia to maintain 'essential services'). Play resumed in 1944, with the 'A' Grade comprising six teams: Blackstone, Bundamba Rangers, Corinthians, Eastern Suburbs, St Helens and Y.M.C.A. The 1945 season saw an additional four teams enter the competition: Shafston Rovers, Thistles, Royal Navy I and II (see photo at right), with St Helens winning the Premiership.

== Post-war to the 1960s: Semi-professionalism and ethnic-based clubs ==
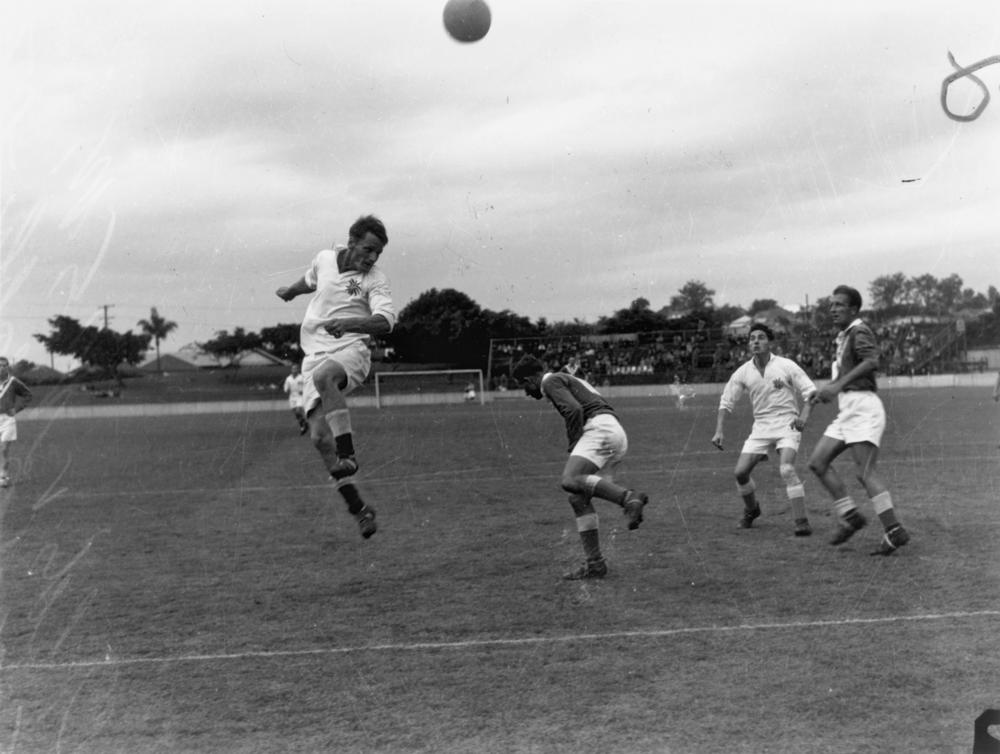
Queensland plays New South Wales in a soccer match at The 'Gabba, 1950

The 1946 season opened brightly, with 31 teams contesting Brisbane senior competitions in three divisions. The First Division comprised ten teams: Blackstone Rovers, Booval Stars, Bundamba, Corinthians (Langlands Park, Greenslopes), Eastern Suburbs (Heath Park, East Brisbane), Latrobe (Gregory Park, Milton), St Helens (Ebbw Vale), Thistle (Lanham Park, The Grange), Shafston Rovers (Raymond Park, Kangaroo Point) and Y.M.C.A., and the Second and Third Divisions twelve and nine teams respectively. The Y.M.C.A team subsequently won the First Division Premiership narrowly over Blackstone Rovers.

However, trouble for the local game was brewing again in that year, when the Corinthian club announced that it would defy the ban on player payments, in order to "bring the dispute with the QSFA to a head"("£1 for a win, 12/6 for a draw, and 7/6 for a losing game"). They added "We hope to have a New South Wales team visit Queensland this season. Every member of that team will be a professional. To be logical, the association should decline to let Queensland amateurs play against them. We believe that players are entitled to a share of the profits from the game, and that Soccer in Queensland will progress when players are paid." This proved to be prescient, as the NSW team thrashed Queensland 10-0 (including eight goals scored by NSW centre-forward and Australian representative, Reg Date).

The Ipswich domination of the soccer competition continued after the war, with its clubs (in particular St Helens, Dinmore Bushrats and Bundamba Rangers) winning eight of the premierships between 1946 and 1959. The quality of Ipswich soccer at the time is evidenced by the inclusion of four of its players in the Australian team at the 1956 Olympics in Melbourne: Brian "Chookie" Vogler, Al Warren, Cliff Sander and Col Kitching. A fifth player, Gordon 'Bunny' Nunn who, despite 33 previous appearances for his country, was ruled ineligible because he had turned 'professional' when he joined a Brisbane club (Caledonian) "for pound stg. 1 and threepence a game" in 1953. Australia defeated Japan 2-0 thanks in part to a goal from Brisbane based Graham McMillan, but was knocked out in the quarter-finals by India 4-2, after two Australian goals were disallowed.

However, the Ipswich domination was not to last: according to one source, the advent of wealthy ethnic clubs in Brisbane in the 1950s and 1960s led to the decline of soccer in Ipswich, through those clubs attracting the best Ipswich players (including Brian Vogler, who had "been lured to the big-spending Brisbane club Hellenic") and also to "the birth of professionalism in Queensland soccer." However, the Ipswich 'decline' may have started as early as 1940 (see above).

=== Ethnic clubs dominate ===
Badge of the former Budapest Grovely (Hungarian) football club (now Westside Grovely FC)

After the war, as part of a "populate or perish" policy, the Australian Government initiated an assisted migration program, which continued until 1973. As well as British and Irish migrants, the government sponsored migrants from European countries, particularly Italy, Greece, Germany and Turkey. As soccer was the overwhelmingly dominant sport in the British Isles and Europe, these people swelled the ranks of players and supporters in Australia and formed their own ethnic-based social clubs and soccer teams. In Brisbane, the larger ethnic groups produced strong teams, such as Azzurri (Italian, now Brisbane City at Newmarket), Budapest-Grovely (Hungarian, now Westside at Grovely), Dnipro (Ukrainian, now defunct), Germania (German, now Southside Eagles at Bulimba), Hellenic (Greek, later St George Souths (after name changes required by the QSF - see below), merged with Olympic in 1979), Hollandia (Dutch, now Lions FC at Richlands) and Polonia (Polish, now defunct). As well as this, for many years Latrobe (now Bardon Latrobe at Bardon) predominantly comprised British and Irish players (Latrobe manager William 'Pop' Harper, himself a British migrant in the early 1900s, encouraged migrants with offers of jobs, accommodation and semi-professional soccer). Indeed, from 1960 to 1978 inclusive, every Brisbane First Division Premiership was won by an ethnic-based club: Azzurri/Brisbane City, Southside Eagles (formerly Germania), Hellenic/St George Souths, Hollandia/Brisbane Lions and Latrobe (see 'Premiers and Cup Winners' below).

However, all was not well in the game during this period - as one writer argues:

The code was also wracked for much of its early post-war history by a conflict between amateur and professional groups within the administration of the sport and clubs. Since only amateurs could take part in the Olympic Games which were to be held in Melbourne in 1956, there was a considerable incentive to ensure that the game was kept free of any taint of professionalism, just at the point when its popularity was taking off as a spectator sport which allowed the emergence of semi-professionalism on a significant scale for the first time. By 1957 the professionals were in the ascendancy, but momentum had been lost and the code was subject to a major split and suspension by FIFA for the poaching of players from European clubs without paying transfer fees. The resulting battles within the code were not ended until 1962.

The early 1960s saw the local game in turmoil once again: The eight first division clubs broke away from the Queensland Soccer Football Association and joined the newly formed Queensland Soccer Federation (QSF). The remaining clubs ultimately joined the QSF and it became the peak body for soccer in Queensland, until the formation of 'Brisbane Men's Soccer' in 2003.

== 1970s: National Soccer League (NSL) commences ==
In the interest of inclusiveness and because perceptions that members of the public saw soccer as a migrants' game, all clubs were required to adopt non-ethnic names after a ruling by the QSF in 1973 (see 'Post-war to the 1960s' above for more information regarding club names).

The early 1970s saw the ethnic-based clubs Brisbane City (formerly Azzurri) and Brisbane Lions (formerly Hollandia) continuing to dominate the local league, with top players of the time including the former Argentinian national goal keeper Osvaldo Borzi and Ian Johnston for City, and former City player Charlie Dench playing for the Lions.

The National Soccer League (NSL) commenced in 1977, with fourteen teams from the Australian Capital Territory, New South Wales, Queensland, South Australia and Victoria. The two teams from Brisbane - Brisbane Lions (formerly Hollandia, with their home ground at Richlands) and Brisbane City (formerly Azzurri SFC, with their home ground at Spencer Park, Newmarket) finished ninth and tenth respectively. Neither club succeeded in winning the championship, but did win the NSL cup (Brisbane City in 1977 and 1978, Brisbane Lions in 1981).

In 1979, a Queensland-wide State League competition was commenced, with Grange Thistle winning the inaugural premiership and grand final. However, this competition was to last only until 1982 (see 'Premiers and Cup Winners' below).

== 1980s: Brisbane competition restructured ==
Brisbane City and Brisbane Lions continued playing in the NSL, with little success (apart from 1981, as noted above). Both teams withdrew from competition after the 1986 season, with Lions re-entering for season 1988, but finishing last. Brisbane United, a new team backed by the QSF, entered the NSL competition in 1991-92 season (the NSL became a Summer competition in 1989-90), but had limited success.

The early 1980s of the State League and Brisbane competitions were dominated by the relatively young Mt Gravatt club (established in 1960), winning four (and runners-up in the other) of the first five premierships of this decade. With the ending of the State League in 1982, the QSF restructured the Brisbane men's senior competition, renaming the top tier as the 'Premier' division for 1983. The premierships for the rest of the decade were shared by Brisbane City, Brisbane Lions (now Lions FC), Ipswich United and North Star.

== 1990s: Brisbane Strikers win NSL ==
The Brisbane United team was re-badged the Brisbane Strikers for the 1993-94 season and finished eighth out of fourteen teams. In the following seasons they performed strongly and ultimately won the championship in the 1996/97 season, defeating Sydney United 2-0 in front of a then record crowd of over 40,000 people at Lang Park in Brisbane. During this decade, the Brisbane Premier League was dominated by Brisbane City (four Premierships), with Brisbane Lions and North Star each winning two.

A significant development for soccer and adversely for Rugby Union was the establishment of the game as an official sport in the private schools in the early 1990s (see Great Public Schools Association of Queensland). Anecdotally, this move was very strongly resisted by the Rugby fraternity in the schools, as they wished to maintain what was perceived as the traditions of amateur football (Rugby was not to become a professional game officially until 1995). Since that time, the game has developed such that many schools now have as many soccer teams as they have Rugby teams.

== 2000s: A-League commences ==
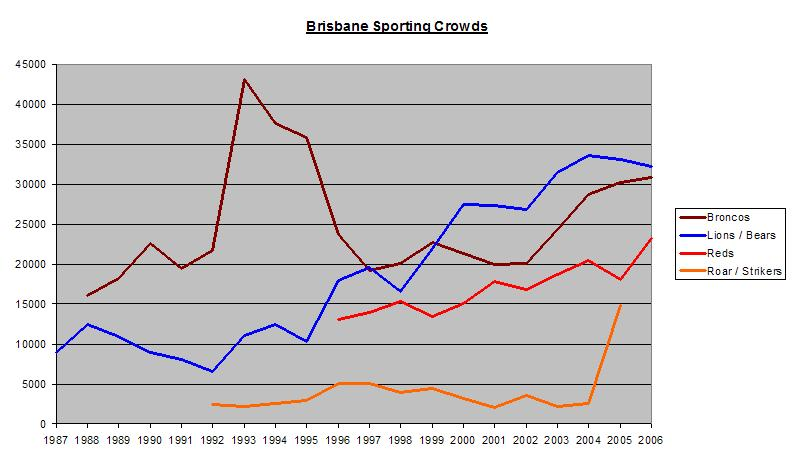
Brisbane Sporting Crowds

In 2003, Brisbane Men's soccer re-structured its senior competition into a semi-professional 'Premier League' with three divisions (Premier, Division 1 and Division 2 and accompanying reserve grade competitions) and an amateur 'Metropolitan League', with no limit to the number of divisions. The Premier divisions featured promotion and relegation each season, whilst the 'Metro' league divisions were populated by nomination.

The early years of this decade were dominated by the Richlands-based Queensland Lions, which won almost all of the Premierships and cup competitions from 2002 to 2004. The Lions club (as Queensland Roar FC), was then successful with their nomination (ahead of the Brisbane Strikers) for the inaugural national A-League competition, which commenced in the 2005-06 (Summer) season. The club changed its name to Brisbane Roar FC in 2009, when teams from the Gold Coast and Townsville were accepted into the A-League in 2009. The Brisbane Roar, despite drawing reasonable crowds, is yet to make serious inroads into the popularity enjoyed by the other football codes (in particular the Brisbane Broncos, Brisbane Lions and the Queensland Reds - see adjacent graph). With the departure of the Brisbane Lions club from the local league, Palm Beach (Gold Coast) and the Brisbane Strikers respectively dominated the following two seasons. Rochedale Rovers dominated the Premiership for the rest of the decade, sharing some silverware with Peninsula Power, Brisbane Wolves and others.

Brisbane Roar acquired its first trophies in the A-League competition by winning the Premiership Plate for season 2010-11, after losing only one match during the season. They then won the 2010-11 Championship grand final in dramatic fashion, scoring twice in the last four minutes of extra time to draw 2 - 2 against the Central Coast Mariners, before going on to win a penalty shoot-out 4-2.

=== Queensland State League commences ===
In 2007, all of the Brisbane soccer bodies (Brisbane Men's Football, Brisbane Women's Soccer, Brisbane North & Districts Junior Soccer Association, Brisbane Southern Districts Junior Soccer Association and Soccer Australia Referees (Brisbane)) amalgamated to form Football Brisbane. The State-wide Queensland State League (QSL) was established in 2008 as the second tier below the A-League, and included local teams the Brisbane Strikers, Olympic FC and Redlands Devils in the inaugural season. However, Redlands and Olympic withdrew from the QSL after the 2009 season and re-entered the Brisbane Premier League. The Strikers club has performed strongly in this competition, finishing as runners-up and champions in the first three seasons of the league.

The Code in Brisbane in the 2000s continues to suffer some disunity, with ongoing disagreements between Brisbane clubs and both the Brisbane and State associations, regarding the structure of various junior and senior competitions and the allocation of resources.

== Honours ==
=== Most first grade premierships ===
(Up to and including season 2017)

Rank	Team	Number of Premierships
1	Hollandia-Inala/Brisbane Lions/Queensland Lions	14
2	Dinmore Bush Rats (defunct, but links to Ipswich Knights)	11
3=	Latrobe (now Bardon Latrobe); Bundamba Rangers (defunct, but links to Ipswich Knights)	9
5=	Azzurri (now Brisbane City); Hellenic/St George-Souths (defunct, but links to Olympic FC)	8
7	Rochedale Rovers	6
8=	Blackstone Rovers (defunct, but links to Ipswich Knights); Corinthians (defunct, but links to Eastern Suburbs; St Helens (defunct, but links to Ipswich Knights)	5
11=	Mt Gravatt; North Star	4
13=	Pineapple Rovers (defunct, but links to Eastern Suburbs and Kangaroo Point Rovers); St Andrews (defunct); Wellington (defunct, but links to Eastern Suburbs); YMCA (defunct, but links to Souths United)	3

== Brisbane's oldest extant clubs ==
=== Oldest club ===
The oldest extant club in continuous existence appears to be Oxley United FC (formerly Oxley Soccer Club and Oxley Ramblers) which, according to club records, was established in 1912 or 1913. Oxley first appears in news reports for Brisbane football in 1918, then joined the Ipswich association in 1930 and rejoined the combined Brisbane-Ipswich association in 1937, in which it has played continuously to date. Oxley club reached its pinnacle in the late 1950s, winning the First Division premiership and a number of cup and shield competitions. The club now plays at Dunlop Park, Corinda.

=== Other old clubs ===
- Kangaroo Point Rovers: The KPR club history outlines links with the Pineapple Rovers club (possibly established in 1886), which also played at Raymond Park, Kangaroo Point (formerly part of the Pineapple Sportsground - see above) for many decades. However, Pineapple Rovers merged with Shafston Rovers to form Eastern Districts in 1940, so the links to the modern club are somewhat tenuous.
- Grange Thistle SC: This club shares a Scottish heritage with St Andrew's, one of the original AQFA teams from 1884. A 'Thistle' club formed as a breakaway from St Andrew's in 1887, then became Merthyr Thistle (New Farm Park) in the early 1900s, which disbanded when a group broke away to form the Thistle club in 1920. This club suspended operations in 1932 and re-emerged as winners of the Junior Division in 1944 before being reinstated to the First Division in 1945. In 1961 the club added the prefix Grange to reflect its local identity. This club plays at Lanham Park in the inner Brisbane suburb of Grange, which was also the base of Thistle in the early 1930s.Grange.
- Ipswich Knights: Blackstone Rovers (1888) merged with Bundamba Rovers (1894) to form Coalstars in 1964. Dinmore Bush Rats (sometime between 1888 and 1890) merged with Redbank Seekers (1910) in the 1950s, which merged with St Helens (formed 1910) in the 1960s. St Helens United then merged with the Coalstars club in 1998 to form the modern Ipswich Knights. The Knights now play at the Eric Evans Reserve, Bundamba.
- Toowong FC: A Toowong club is reported as early as 1911, however it is uncertain which football code it was playing. The first results recorded for a Toowong 'soccer' club were in 1913, whilst reports also refer to a Toowong Caledonians 'soccer' club and a 'new' Toowong senior club forming in the early 1920s. However, Toowong clubs appear to have disbanded then re-formed a few times over the decades. The modern Toowong club plays at Dunmore Park, Auchenflower.
- Redlands (1918), Mitchelton (1920) and Easts (1922): These clubs' published histories assert the founding dates as noted. However, the available public records for these clubs do not appear for a few years after these dates, so their respective histories are uncertain.

The oldest extant club that has played continuously in Brisbane senior men's competitions appears to be Wynnum, which entered the Brisbane First Division in 1921, the year the club was formed. The club is now known as Wynnum Wolves FC and plays at Carmichael Park, Tingalpa.

The oldest club that has played continuously in Brisbane competitions appears to be Bardon Latrobe. The Latrobe club first appears in newspaper reports in 1917, playing at Gregory Park (adjacent to the Milton State School). After mergers and de-mergers with the Milton (1930s) and Bardon (1941) clubs, the club merged with Bardon again in 1970, and commenced playing at Bowman Park Bardon (the original Bardon club's home ground). The senior section of the club then went through a further merger with the Mitchelton football club, with some players rejoining to form Bardon Latrobe senior teams in the late 1970s through to the early 1980s. From the mid-1990s, the club played only in Brisbane junior competitions, but in 2011 rejoined the ranks of senior football, with teams in the Brisbane men's and women's leagues.

The oldest club in its original form and still using its original name that has played continuously in the Brisbane senior competitions appears to be Taringa Rovers, formed in 1949. The club plays at Jack Speare Park at Indooroopilly, where it has been since 1955.

== Governing Bodies ==
- 1884-1889: Anglo-Queensland Football Association
- 1890-1919: Queensland British Football Association
- 1920-1927: Queensland Football Association
- 1928-1939: Brisbane and District Football Association
- 1940-1945: Queensland Soccer Football Association
- 1946-1961: Brisbane and Ipswich Soccer Football Association
- 1962-2002: Queensland Soccer Federation
- 2003-2005: Brisbane Men's Soccer
- 2006: Brisbane Men's Football
- 2007–2021: Football Brisbane
- 2021–present: Football Queensland Metro

== See also ==
- Association football in Queensland
- Association football in Australia
- Football Queensland
- Sport in Brisbane
- Brisbane Premier League Honours List
- Canale Cup
