= Rovers =

Rovers may refer to:

== Sports ==
- Rovers Cup

=== Association football teams ===
- A.F.C. Kempston Rovers, based in Kempston, Bedfordshire, England
- Albion Rovers F.C. (Newport), Wales
- Albion Rovers F.C., Coatbridge, Scotland
- Antrim Rovers F.C. II, Northern Ireland
- Blackburn Rovers F.C., England
- Blackpool Wren Rovers F.C., Lancashire, England
- Bolney Rovers, Bolney, West Sussex, England
- Boston Rovers, a defunct American soccer team in the United Soccer Association
- Bristol Rovers F.C., England
- Caledon Rovers F.C., Northern Ireland
- Doncaster Rovers F.C., England
- Dungannon Rovers F.C., Northern Ireland
- Fall River Rovers, a defunct United States soccer club, based in Fall River, Massachusetts
- Forest Green Rovers F.C., Gloucestershire, England
- Greencastle Rovers F.C., Northern Ireland
- Nyenye Rovers FC, Lesotho
- Paulton Rovers F.C., near Bristol, England
- Portaferry Rovers F.C., Northern Ireland
- Raith Rovers F.C., Kirkcaldy, Scotland
- River City Rovers, Louisville, Kentucky, United States
- Rochedale Rovers Football Club, Queensland, Australia
- Roma Rovers FC, Lesotho
- Rovers F.C. (Glasgow), Glasgow, Scotland
- Rovers FC (Guam)
- Shamrock Rovers F.C., Dublin, Ireland
- Sligo Rovers F.C., Sligo, Ireland
- Tampines Rovers FC, Singapore
- Tandragee Rovers F.C., Northern Ireland
- Taringa Rovers Soccer Football Club, Brisbane, Australia
- Tranmere Rovers F.C., Birkenhead, England
- Welton Rovers F.C., Somerset, England

=== Rugby league teams ===
- Featherstone Rovers, Featherstone, United Kingdom
- Hull Kingston Rovers, Kingston upon Hull, United Kingdom
- Richmond Rovers, Grey Lynn, New Zealand

=== Other teams ===
- Ilen Rovers, a Gaelic football club in County Cork, Ireland
- New York Rovers, a defunct ice hockey team in New York City, U.S.
- Valley Rovers, a hurling club in County Cork, Ireland

== Other ==
- Rover Scout, a programme for young adults associated with some Scout organizations
  - Rovers (Australia), the fifth and final youth section of Scouts Australia
- Rovers (TV series)
- The Rovers (TV series)
- Radio Rovers, the official radio station of the English Championship football side Blackburn Rovers FC

== See also ==
- Rover (disambiguation)
- Rovers Football Club (disambiguation)
