= Rovers Football Club =

Rovers Football Club may refer to:

- Rovers Football Club (1949-), a football club competing in the Central Australian Football League
- Rovers Football Club (1882-1899), a defunct football club from Western Australia (competed in West Australian Football League)
- Rover Football Club (1882), a defunct football club from Queensland (competed in Queensland Football Association (1880-1890))

== See also ==
- Rovers FC (disambiguation)
- Rovers § Sports
