= Rover =

Rover may refer to:

== People ==
=== Name ===
- Constance Rover (1910–2005), English historian
- Jolanda de Rover (born 1963), Dutch swimmer
- Rover Thomas (c. 1920–1998), Indigenous Australian artist

=== Stage name ===
- Rover (musician), French singer-songwriter and musician, born Timothée Régnier in 1979

== Places ==
- Rover, Arkansas, US
- Rover, Missouri, US
- Røver Anchorage, Bouvet Island, Norway
- Rover Creek, British Columbia, Canada

== Arts and entertainment ==
=== Literature ===
- Rover, the US title of They Came on Viking Ships, a children's novel by Jackie French
- The Rover (story paper), a British boys' story paper which started in 1922

=== Music ===
- Rover (EP), a 2023 extended play by Kai
  - "Rover" (Kai song)
- "Rover" (BlocBoy JB song), 2018
  - "Rover 2.0", a 2018 remake by BlocBoy JB featuring 21 Savage from the mixtape Simi
- "Rover" (S1mba song), 2020 viral hit by S1mba featuring DTG
- "Rover" (UCLA song), a sports cheer at the University of California Los Angeles

=== Fiction ===
- Rover (Animal Crossing), a character in the video game series Animal Crossing by Nintendo
- Rover (robot dog), a character on Lunar Jim always helping on Jim's missions
- Rover (The Prisoner), a fictional balloon device in the 1967 British television program The Prisoner
- Rover, the main character in the novella Roverandom by J.R.R. Tolkien
- Rover, the name of two vehicles with artificial intelligence, built by Marvel Comics' Hank Pym
- The Rovers, an informal name for the Rovers Return Inn, a fictional pub in British soap opera Coronation Street

=== Television ===
- Rovers (TV series), a British television show

== Science ==
- Rover (space exploration), a vehicle that explores the surface of an astronomical body
  - Lunar rover, a vehicle designed to move across the surface of the Moon
  - Mars rover, a vehicle designed to explore the surface of Mars
- ROVER, a military system that receives video images from aircraft

== Sport ==
- Rover (ice hockey), a long-defunct ice hockey position
- Rover, a position in Australian rules football

== Transport ==
=== Automobiles and motorcycles ===
- Freight Rover (1981–1986), a commercial vehicle manufacturing division of Leyland
- Land Rover Group (1981–1987), a light commercial vehicle division of Leyland
- Land Rover, a brand of 4-wheel drive vehicles by the British manufacturer Jaguar Land Rover
- MG Rover Group (2000–2005), a British mass-production car manufacturer, formerly the Rover Group
- Rover Company (1885–1967), a British car manufacturing company, absorbed into Leyland Motor Corporation
- Rover Group (1986–2000), a British car manufacturer, previously known as British Leyland
- Rover Light Armoured Car, an armoured car produced in Australia during World War II
- Rover (marque), British automotive marque (brand) in use from 1904 to 2005
- Rover (motorcycles), a British bicycle and motorcycle manufacturer before it began the manufacture of motor cars

=== Business (transport) ===
- Rover (ticket), a type of bus or train travel card ticket issued in the UK
- Rover Coaches, an Australian bus company operating services in the Hunter Valley

=== Locomotives ===
- GWR Rover class, a class of locomotives on the Great Western Railway
- Rover, a GWR 3031 Class locomotive in service on the Great Western Railway between 1891 and 1915

=== Watercraft ===
- HMS Rover, the name of seven ships of the Royal Navy
- Rover (barque), the American merchant ship involved in the Rover Incident of 1867
- Rover (log canoe), a Chesapeake Bay log canoe, built about 1886
- Rover (privateering ship), a ship from Nova Scotia, launched in 1800
- Rover (yacht), a luxury steam yacht built for P&O chairman, Lord Inchcape, in 1930
- Rover-class tanker, a class of ships in the Royal Fleet Auxiliary of the UK

== Other uses ==
- Rover (fish), common name for fish in the family Emmelichthyidae
- Rover chair, designed by industrial designer Ron Arad
- Rover Ruckus, the fourteenth FIRST Tech Challenge game
- Rover Scout, a programme within Scouting in some countries for young men and women above the age range for Boy and Girl Scouts
- Rover (American company), a company that sells pet care services

== See also ==
- Rovere (disambiguation)
- The Rover (disambiguation)
- Rovers (disambiguation)
- Roving (disambiguation)
