= Roving (disambiguation) =

Roving is a long and narrow bundle of fiber.

It may also refer to:

- Roving bridge, also known as changeline bridge or turnover bridge, a bridge over a canal constructed to allow a horse towing a boat to cross the canal when the towpath changes sides
- Roving Enterprises, Australian television production company
- Roving reference, a library service model
- Roving wiretap, a wiretap that follows the surveillance target

== See also ==
- Roving Boy (1980–1983), American Champion Thoroughbred racehorse
- Roving Crows, English folk fusion band
- The Maid of Amsterdam, sea shanty also known as "A-Roving"
- Rover
- The Rover
