= Rover Creek =

Coordinates: 49°27′N 117°31′W

Rover Creek is a creek in the West Kootenay Region of British Columbia. The creek is located west of Forty Nine Creek and flows into the Kootenay River. The creek has been mined for gold.
