= Greencastle Rovers F.C. =

Greencastle Rovers
- Full name: Greencastle Rovers Football Club
- Nickname: The Rovers
- Ground: Valley Playing Fields
- League: Ballymena & Provincial Football League

Greencastle Rovers Football Club, known as Greencastle Rovers or simply The Rovers, is an intermediate-level football club playing in the Ballymena & Provincial Football League Intermediate Division 2 in Northern Ireland. Greencastle Rovers reserves compete in the BPFL Junior Division 1. The club is based in the north Belfast area and Newtownabbey.

Greencastle Rovers is a member of the County Antrim Football Association. They compete in regional competitions, like the Junior Shield, as well as the national cup. The senior team completed a treble in the 2025–26 season.

== History ==
Greencastle Rovers played in the Northern Amateur Football League in the 2010s. In 2013, they reached the Cochrane Corry Cup final, losing to Rosemount Rec F.C.

=== NAFL Dispute ===
Following a period of disbandment, Greencastle Rovers formerly reformed and played in the Belfast and District League for five years.

In Spring 2023, they applied to rejoin the Northern Amateur Football League for the 2023–24 season. The NAFL Board initially approved their application and extended an invitation to join the league on 11 May 2023, as they were under the belief that the club had satisfied the mandatory league requirement of five consecutive seasons of active adult affiliation.

A third-party representative pointed out that Greencastle had not actively played league fixtures during their 2018–19 reformation year, they had only completed four consecutive seasons of active competition instead of the required five of adult football. Following an internal investigation, the NAFL Board officially withdrew the club's invitation to join the league on 30 June 2023.

The club, represented by Jamie Bryson, appealed this decision to the Irish Football Association Appeals Committee. However the IFA dismissed this appeal.

Following the ruling, Greencastle Rovers joined the Ballymena & Provincial Football League.

=== League and cup success ===
In 2023, Greencastle Rovers won the County Antrim Junior Shield for the first time in their history. They beat Beaan Mhadaghain 3 - 0.

The Rovers played a historic and highly dominant 2025/26 campaign, going entirely unbeaten with 21 wins from 21 matches to comfortably secure the Junior Division 1 league championship ahead of rivals Berlin Swifts. They finished the season with the treble winning the Canada Trophy, beating Berlin Swifts 2 - 0, and the County Antrim Junior Shield for a second time. In the same season, Greencastle Reserves won Junior Division 2.

== Club identity ==
Greencastle Rovers gets its name from Greencastle, a townland in north Belfast and beside Newtownabbey. Greencastle Rovers is a community-ran club that has various age groups, starting from under-5's and upwards. They field youth teams in the South Belfast Youth League.

They play in all-green. Their away kit is grey. Home fixtures are played at the Valley Playing Fields on Church Road, Newtownabbey.

== Honours ==
Ballymena & Provincial Football League

- Junior Division 1
  - 2025–26
- Junior Division 2
  - 2024-26 - won by reserves
- Canada Trophy
  - 2025–26

Northern Amateur Football League

- 3rd Division D
  - 2013–14

County Antrim Football Association

- Junior Shield
  - 2022–23, 2025–26
