= The Rover =

The Rover may refer to:

== Print and online publications ==
- The Rover (novel) by Joseph Conrad
- The Rover (play) by Aphra Behn
- The Rover (story paper), a former British boy's story paper
- The Rover, a Canadian online arts journal published by Marianne Ackerman

== Films ==
- The Rover (1967 film) Italian film by Terence Young
- The Rover (2014 film) Australian film by David Michôd

== Music ==
- "The Rover" (Led Zeppelin song)
- "The Rover" (Interpol song)
- "The Irish Rover", a traditional Irish song
- "The Wild Rover", a traditional English song

== See also ==
- Rover
- Roving (disambiguation)
