= Rovere =

Rovere may refer to

- Italian noble House of Della Rovere or any of its members
- Italian name of Sessile Oak
- Roveré Veronese, an Italian municipality
- Roveré della Luna, an Italian municipality
- Rovere, Rocca di Mezzo, a frazione of Rocca di Mezzo, Province of L'Aquila, Abruzzo, Italy
- Lucrezia Lante della Rovere (born 1966), Italian actress
- Richard Rovere (1915–1979), American journalist
- Gino Rovere (fl. 1934–1938), Italian racing driver

== See also ==
- Rover (disambiguation)
