= Jack Speare Park =

Sports venue in Indooroopilly, Queensland

Coordinates: 27°30′08.39″S 152°58′53.28″E

Jack Speare Park, formerly known as the Indooroopilly Recreation Reserve ('The Rec'), was named for one of the founders of the Taringa Rovers Soccer Football Club (soccer) and Taringa Rovers Cricket Club.

The ground is bounded by Fairley Street, Lambert and Carnarvon Roads at Indooroopilly, and features two football fields, junior fields, a turf cricket pitch, dressing rooms and licensed club house.

The field was named by former Brisbane Lord Mayor Sallyanne Atkinson in the late 1980s, to honour Mr Speare's contributions to football and the local community.

== See also ==
- Sport in Brisbane
