= Taringa Rovers SFC =

Taringa Rovers S.F.C.
- Full name: Taringa Rovers Soccer Football Club Inc.
- Nickname: The Rovers
- Short name: Taringa
- Founded: 1949
- Ground: Jack Speare Park
- Capacity: 600
- Coach: Gareth Thomas
- League: Queensland Premier League 2
- 2026: 7th of 12
- Website: https://www.taringarovers.com.au/
Home colours	Away colours

Taringa Rovers is an Australian soccer club based at Indooroopilly, in the west of Brisbane, Australia. The club was founded in 1949 by Jack Speare and Ernie Dixon.

The club started with one junior team, playing out of Moore Park, Indooroopilly and moved to the Indooroopilly Recreation Reserve (now named Jack Speare Park) at Fairley Street Indooroopilly, in 1955. in 2025 Taringa Rovers will field over 85 teams, from its 1,150 players, male and female, with ages ranging from 4 to 60.

Taringa Rovers provides the following football programs: - Squirts training program for ages 3 - 5 (mixed program) - Inhouse mini-roos football for ages 5 - 7 (mixed program) - Small sided football (Interclub) for ages 7 - 12 (male and female teams & competitions) - After school skill training programs for ages 7 - 12 (mixed program) - School Holiday skill training programs for ages 7 - 12 (mixed program) - Metro junior divisional football (Interclub) for ages 12 - 18 (male and female teams & competitions) - Metro senior divisional football (Interclub) - (male and female teams & competitions) - Over 35 & Over 45 Mens football (Interclub) - FQ Academy Boys football for ages 8 - 18 - Queensland Premier League 2 Mens and u23 teams

== Current Queensland Premier League 2 Men's squad 2025 ==
As of 03 03 2025

Note: Flags indicate national team as defined under FIFA eligibility rules; some limited exceptions apply. Players may hold more than one non-FIFA nationality.

No.	Pos.	Nation	Player
1	GK	BRB	Brandon Sumpter
51	GK	AUS	Alexander Graham
17	FW	AUS	Dylan Brockhurst
3	MF	POR	Rafael Prates Cowan
5	DF	AUS	Benjamin Coombes
6	MF	AUS	Byron Skinner
9	FW	AUS	Daniel Hupje
8	FW	SCO	Louis Thompson
10	FW	AUS	Matthew Gordon
7	MF	JPN	Yuta Kasahara
33	MF	AUS	Nicholas Tziolis

No.	Pos.	Nation	Player
40	DF	AUS	Joseph Doherty
38	DF	AUS	Jarrah McNicol
4	DF	AUS	Pasifike Ismail
14	MF	AUS	Kieran Harrison
22	FW	AUS	Yuri Utatao
24	MF	AUS	Kyle Bell
12	FW	AUS	Thomas Whittaker
15	MF	AUS	Connall Cunningham
37	FW	AUS	Theodore Belavy

=== TRSFC Academy Player Progression to First Team ===
Taringa Rovers Academy Graduates who have played a League Match for Taringa Rovers Queensland Premier League 2 first-team in 2024.

Note: Flags indicate national team as defined under FIFA eligibility rules; some limited exceptions apply. Players may hold more than one non-FIFA nationality.

No.	Pos.	Nation	Player STARTING PLAYER
—	FW	AUS	William Ciereszko
—	FW	AUS	Hugh Ciereszko
—	MF	AUS	Nicholas Tziolis
—	GK	AUS	Alexander Graham
—	MF	POR	Rafael Prates Cowan
—	FW	AUS	Harry Mogg

No.	Pos.	Nation	Player SUBSTITUTE PLAYER
—	MF	AUS	Conall Cunningham
—	FW	AUS	Dylan Brockhurst
—	FW	AUS	Theodore Belavy
—	FW	AUS	Zak Noble
—	DF	AUS	Tafara Muzenda

Taringa Rovers Academy Graduates who have played a League Match for Taringa Rovers Queensland Premier League 2 first-team in 2025.

Note: Flags indicate national team as defined under FIFA eligibility rules; some limited exceptions apply. Players may hold more than one non-FIFA nationality.

No.	Pos.	Nation	Player STARTING PLAYER
—	MF	AUS	Nicholas Tziolis
—	GK	AUS	Alexander Graham
—	MF	POR	Rafael Prates Cowan
—	MF	AUS	Conall Cunningham
—	DF	AUS	Tafara Muzenda
—	DF	AUS	Jacob Hanrahan

No.	Pos.	Nation	Player SUBSTITUTE PLAYER
—	FW	AUS	Dylan Brockhurst
—	DF	AUS	Charlie Burke
—	MF	AUS	Sebastion Budde
—	MF	AUS	Federico Traversi
—	MF	AUS	Oscar Lukin

== See also ==
- History of association football (soccer) in Brisbane, Queensland
