= Forty Nine Creek =

- Location within British Columbia Location within Canada

Location
- Country: Canada

Physical characteristics
- Source
  - location: West Kootenay region of British Columbia
- Mouth
  - coordinates: 49°28′11″N 117°27′49″W

Basin features
- Progression: Kootenay River→ Columbia River

Forty Nine Creek is a creek located in the West Kootenay region of British Columbia. The creek flows north from Bonnington Range into the Kootenay River.

== History ==
Forty Nine Creek was discovered in the 1860s. The creek was mined for gold. Methods of mining used include hydraulicking, drifting, and ground sluicing. In the 1930s syndicates like Black Watch mined the creek.
