= Rovers FC =

Rovers FC or Rovers F.C. may refer to:

- Rovers FC (Guam), a football team from Guam
- Rovers FC (U.S. Virgin Islands), a football team from the U.S. Virgin Islands
- Rovers F.C. (Glasgow)
- Rovers F.C. (Mexico)
