= Roving reference =

Library service model

Roving reference, also called roaming reference, is a library service model in which, instead of being positioned at a static reference desk, a librarian moves throughout the library to locate patrons with questions or concerns and offer them help in finding or using library resources.

== History ==
Roving reference as a library service practice was first formalized in the late 1980s and early 1990s. A 1999 report from the International Federation of Library Associations identified several advantages and disadvantages with roving reference in the pre- mobile era. The roving model allowed librarians to engage with "the majority of users who have questions in mind [who] do not approach the reference desk for assistance". However, libraries reported that some staff were uncomfortable with the practice, and that there were concerns about user privacy.

Beginning in the 2000s, librarians used laptops or laptop carts to engage in technology-supported roaming reference. Since the development of mobile technologies, roving reference can be facilitated with the use of such technologies, such as tablet computers, which allow librarians to readily check the online public access catalogue or the library's electronic databases while away from their desk. This has contributed to the increased popularization of roving-reference programs as supplements for more traditional reference desks. The model has also been extended to service beyond the library building (library outreach), for example in a dormitory or faculty building at an academic institution.
