= Bulimba Memorial Park =

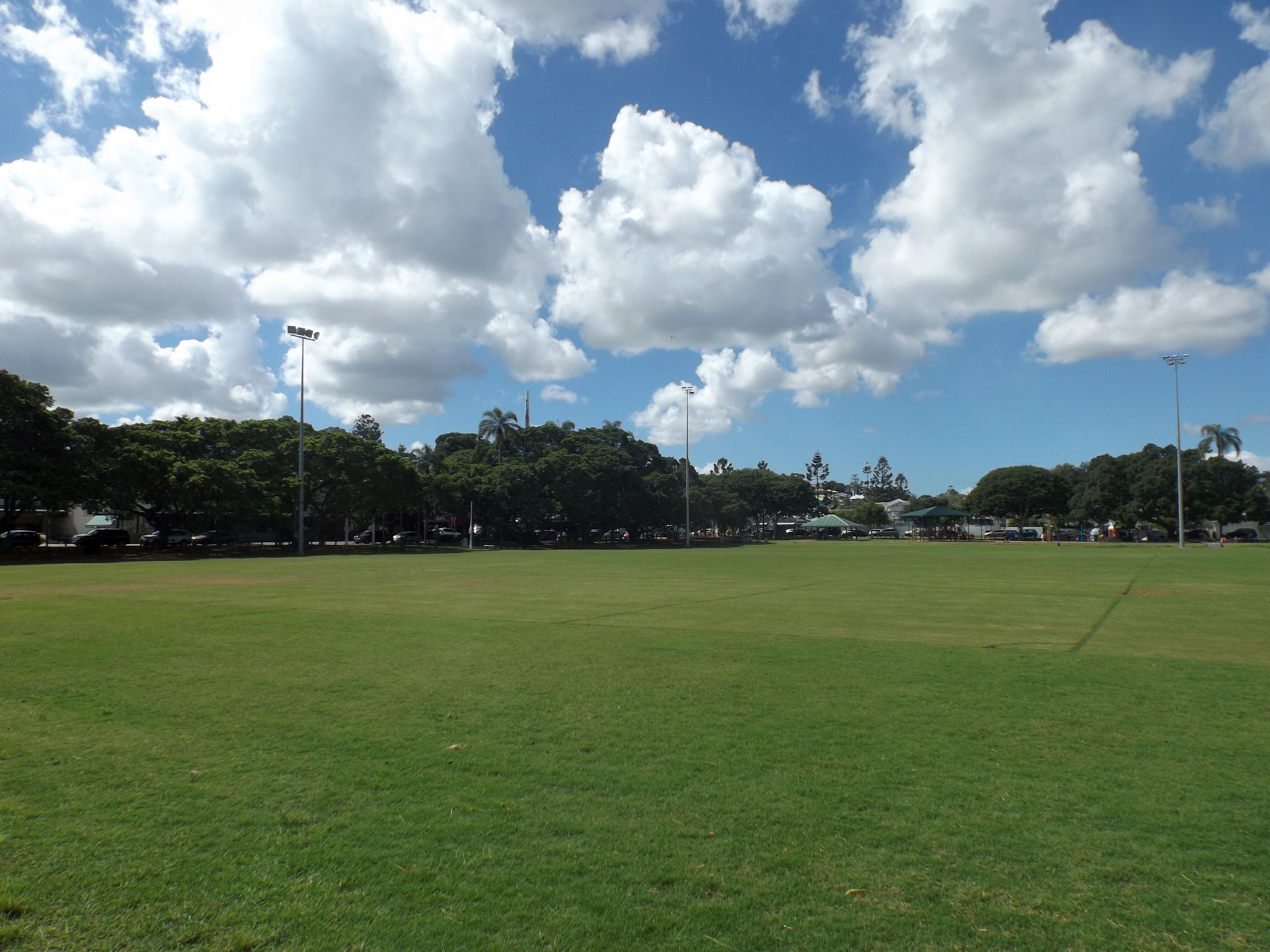
- Field in 2015

- Location within Queensland Location within Australia
- 27.4524°S 153.0572°E
- Location: 129 Oxford Street, Bulimba, Queensland, Australia

History
- Design period: 1914–1919 (World War I)
- Built: 1919–1980s

Queensland Heritage Register
- Official name: Bulimba Memorial Park, Bulimba Soldiers and Sailors Memorial Park, Jamieson Park
- Type: state heritage (landscape, built)
- Designated: 21 October 1992
- Reference no.: 600180
- Significant period: 1904– (social); 1919–1923 (fabric); 1904–1980s (historical)
- Significant components: shed – shelter, clubroom/s / clubhouse, memorial – tree/avenue of trees, hall – scouts / guides, memorial – gate/s

Bulimba Memorial Park is a heritage-listed park at 129 Oxford Street, Bulimba, Queensland, Australia. It was built from 1919 to 1980s. It is also known as Bulimba Soldiers & Sailors Memorial Park and Jamieson Park. It was added to the Queensland Heritage Register on 21 October 1992.

== History ==
Part of Bulimba Memorial Park may have been established by the Balmoral Shire Council as early as c. 1904, as Jamieson Park. Following the First World War (1914–18) it was opened officially on 1 November 1919 by Walter Barnes, Member of the Queensland Legislative Assembly as the Bulimba Soldiers and Sailors Memorial Park, dedicated to Bulimba servicemen and women who had served in the Great War.

Robert Jamieson was an early Bulimba farmer and the park is part of his c. 1888 subdivision of portion 7. Bulimba ratepayers had discussed the acquisition of part of Jamieson's land for a recreation ground as early as January 1888, when it was offered to them at a reduced price. Nearly 4 acres (1.6 ha) of this land eventually was acquired by the Balmoral Shire Council in 1904, and in subsequent years a number of adjacent subdivisions were incorporated within the park. The first memorials erected in the park were the Oxford Road formal entrance gateway and an adjacent pillar. A plaque on the memorial pillar records that the park is dedicated to the soldiers, sailors and nurses who enlisted from Bulimba for service in the Great War 1914–1919.

Between 1919 and 1923 trees were planted along the Stuart, Godwin and Oxford Street frontages. Each tree bore a commemorative plaque honouring a serviceman killed in action. These plaques have since disappeared, and only six names are recorded. Most of the surviving memorial trees are located along Oxford Street.

The grandstand on the Godwin Street side was built about 1923 through local fund raising efforts. It has been suggested that the architect was George Henry Male Addison, who designed the nearby Bulimba ferry wharf building.

In 1925, the park became the property of the Brisbane City Council, following the creation of Greater Brisbane.

A shelter shed near the corner of Oxford and Stuart Streets appears to date from the 1920s. Other structures on the site include playground equipment adjacent to the shelter shed and 1950s Girl Guides and Boy Scouts buildings. The former Boy Scout Hut is leased by the Southside Eagles Soccer Club and has been extended. The Babs Shield Senior Citizens Club was built c. 1983. Other buildings include 1980s toilet facilities and a canteen.

During the 1980s the Brisbane City Council found that not all the subdivisions which comprised the park were Council owned. These were officially acquired, including the unformed James Street, and by 1990 the park contained over 4.6 hectares (11 acres).

The park has been a venue for local cricket, rugby, soccer and other recreational uses since early this century. It is adjacent to the local shopping centre and it is the only remaining open park land with sporting facilities in the district.

== Description ==
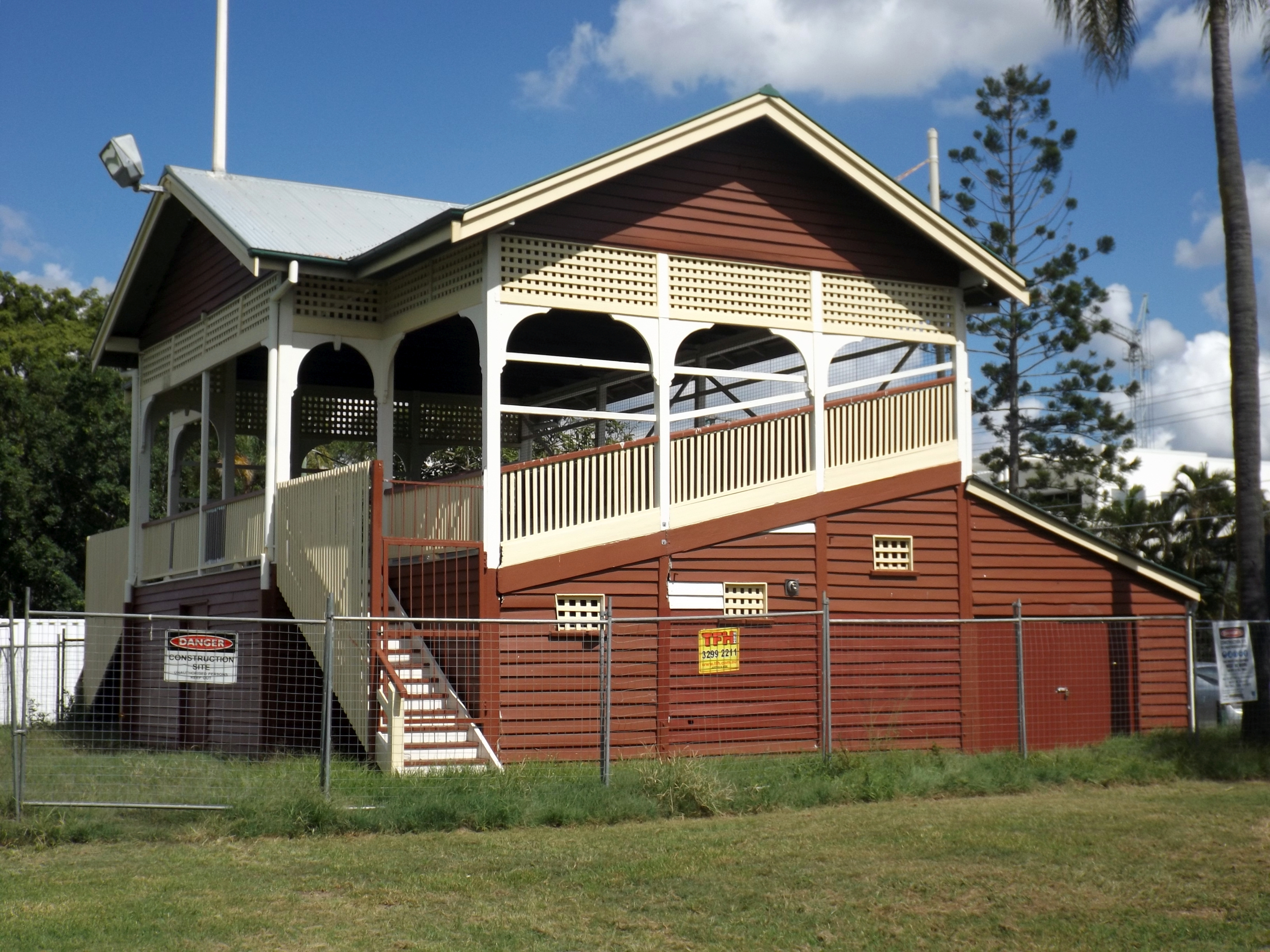
Grandstand, 2015

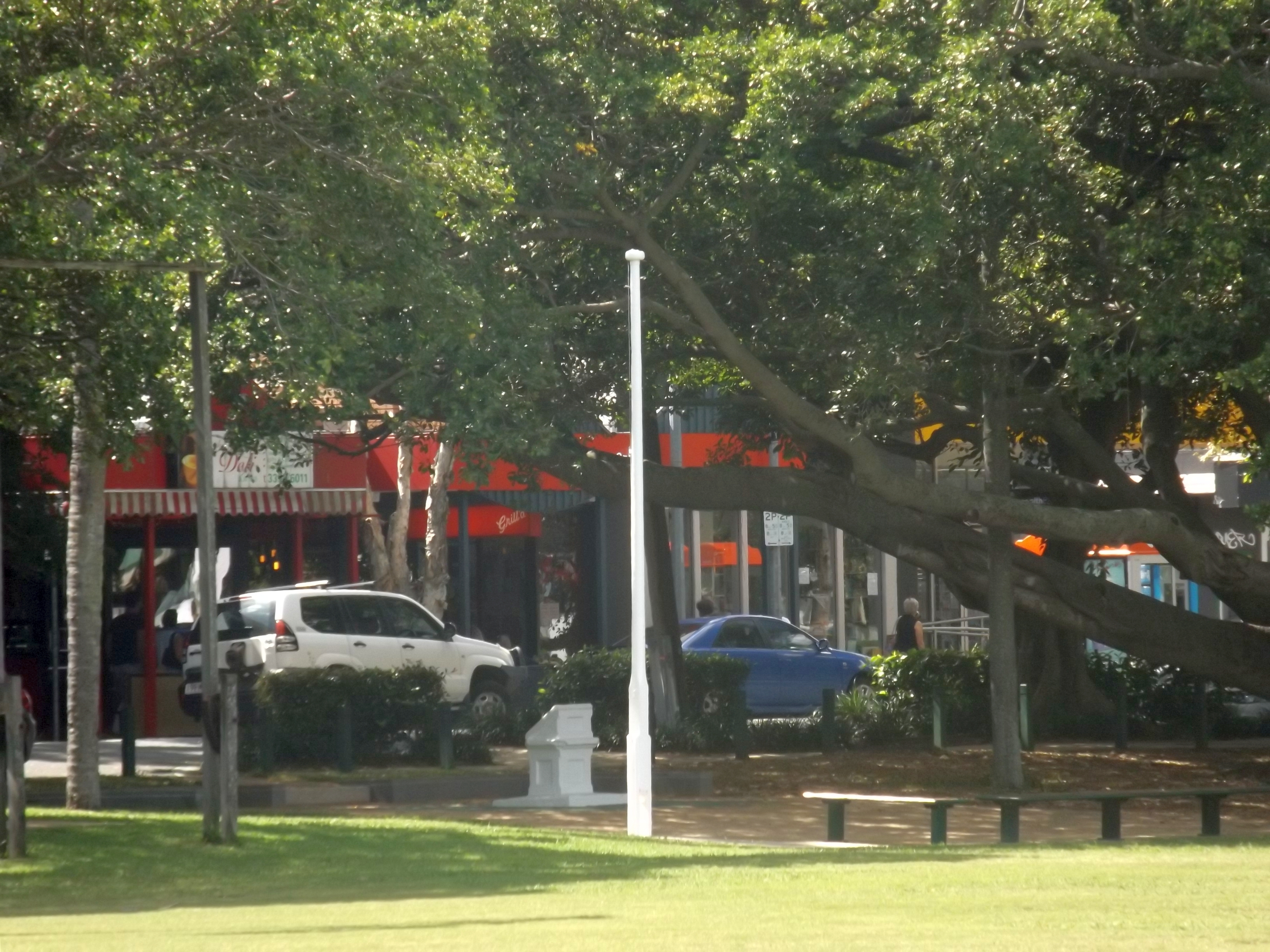
War memorial, 2015

Bulimba Memorial Park comprises approximately 4.6 hectares (11 acres) of land in the heart of the suburb of Bulimba, bounded by Godwin Street to the west, Oxford Street on the north, Stuart Street to the east, and housing and sections of Barramul Street to the south. The extensive perimeter is delineated by regularly spaced timber posts, and the roadway boundaries ensure free access and visibility and plenty of street parking for park users. The ground is flat, and apart from some perimeter plantings, mostly comprises open playing fields.

The park contains a number of elements intended as memorials to local persons who served in the First World War. These include:

- memorial gateway (c. 1919), a wrought iron arch bearing the words Memorial Park, supported by a pair of solid timber posts, is located along the Oxford Street boundary
- memorial pillar (c. 1919), adjacent to the Oxford Street gateway, resembles a small solid lectern constructed of concrete. It has a square base and a short pedestal with cornice. A brass memorial plaque is set on the face of the lectern.
- memorial trees (c. 1919–23), principally figs with alternating palms. The mature trees, mostly along Oxford Street, provide shade for spectators and locals enjoying the park's open space.
- memorial grandstand (c. 1923), a two-storeyed timber structure with a gable roof of corrugated iron, located midway along the Godwin Street side of the park. The symmetrical front facade is dominated by a wide gabled bay which is flanked by access stairs that lead to the raked back seating in the upper level. The sloped seating is balanced by the angle of the skillion roof of the rear changing rooms at ground level. The grandstand is open-sided, the roof being supported by slender timber columns with winged brackets. Decorative elements include dowel balustrades and lattice valance panels.

Other structures within the park include a shelter shed (c. 1920s) near the corner of Oxford and Stuart Streets, Girl Guides' Hall (1950s), former Scout Hut (1950s – now a soccer club), senior citizens' club (c. 1983), public toilets (1980s) and canteen (1980s).

The c. 1920s shelter shed is an open-sided structure, with timber posts with winged brackets supporting a short-ridged roof of corrugated iron.

The soccer club is a two-storeyed, L-shaped building with a corrugated iron gable roof. The ground floor is constructed of concrete bricks while the first floor is weatherboard, and there is an extensive timber deck at first floor level. The Girl Guides' Hall is a two- storeyed weatherboard structure with a gable roof of corrugated iron. The senior citizens' club, at the corner of Stuart and Barramul Streets, is a brick and glass, L-shaped structure. Near the 1923 grandstand are brick public toilets and a concrete block canteen, both with flat roofs.

== Heritage listing ==
Bulimba Memorial Park was listed on the Queensland Heritage Register on 21 October 1992 having satisfied the following criteria.

The place is important in demonstrating the evolution or pattern of Queensland's history.

Bulimba Memorial Park is significant as a First World War memorial park with extensive and varied components. The trees are significant for their commemorative function, aesthetic value and practical usage.

The place demonstrates rare, uncommon or endangered aspects of Queensland's cultural heritage.

The place is important as a Brisbane open space which, unusually, is available for both organised and informal recreational use.

The place is important because of its aesthetic significance.

The grandstand is a fine example of interwar vernacular domestic architecture adapted to non-domestic use. The trees are significant for their commemorative function, aesthetic value and practical usage. The park is a community landmark which has been used for a variety of social and recreational functions for over eight decades, and its aesthetic value contributes significantly to the Bulimba townscape.

The place has a strong or special association with a particular community or cultural group for social, cultural or spiritual reasons.

The place is important as a Brisbane open space which, unusually, is available for both organised and informal recreational use. The park is a community landmark which has been used for a variety of social and recreational functions for over eight decades, and its aesthetic value contributes significantly to the Bulimba townscape.
