= BSFS =

BSFS may refer to:

- Bill Snyder Family Stadium, the football stadium of Kansas State University
- Bachelor of Science in Foreign Service, an undergraduate degree offered by Georgetown University's Walsh School of Foreign Service
- Baltimore Science Fiction Society, a literary organization in Baltimore, Maryland, United States
- Bristol stool scale, also known as the Bristol Stool Form Scale, which helps communication about stools in health care
- British-Soviet Friendship Society, a former organization in Britain (1946–1991)
