= Berlin Swifts F.C. =

Berlin Swifts
- Full name: Berlin Swifts & Swiftettes Football Club
- Founded: Reestablished in 2011
- Ground: Advantage Park
- League: Northern Amateur Football League

Berlin Swifts & Swiftettes Football Club, known by their nickname the Swifts for the men's team, and the Swiftettes for the women's team. Berlin Swifts is an intermediate-level football club that most recently played in the Ballymena & Provincial Football League Junior Division 1 in Northern Ireland. In 2026, they announced that they were accepted into the Northern Amateur Football League for the 2026/27 season.

Berlin Swifts have two reserves teams, one competes in BPFL Junior Division 3 and the other competes in the Belfast & District League. The club is based in the civil parish of Shankill, Belfast, County Antrim. The club plays in the Irish Cup and the IFA Junior Cup. Berlin Swifts are a member of the County Antrim Football Association.

== History ==
Berlin Swifts reestablished in 2011 and entered the Ballymena & Provincial Football League.

In 2025, Berlin Swifts & Swiftettes were named the McDonald’s IFA Club of the Year.

The Swifts were crowned champions of the BPFL Division 2 in 2025, securing the championship in dramatic fashion with a 97th-minute goal against Glebe Rangers.

In April 2026, Jonathan McClelland won Volunteer of the Year award at the Belfast Sports Awards. Belfast City Council had sponsored him.

In 2026, Berlin Swifts beat Ballynure Old Boys 5 - 1 in the Linda Welshman Memorial Cup final, marking a cup double.

In June 2026, Berlin Swifts announced that they had been accepted into the Northern Amateur Football League for the 2026/27 season.

== Club identity ==
Berlin Swifts play their home games at Advantage Park on the Ballygomartin Road. They play in red and white candy stripes. Their away kit is all-blue.

== Honours ==
Ballymena & Provincial Football League

- Junior Division 2
  - 2024/25
- Linda Welshman Memorial Cup
  - 2025/2026

Irish Football Association

- IFA Club of the Year
  - 2025

Belfast Sports Awards

- Volunteer of the Year
  - 2026 - Jonathan McClelland
