= Soccer in Queensland =

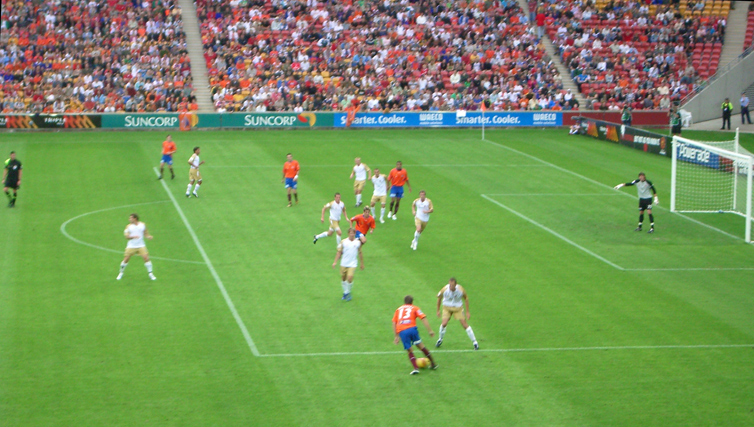
- Brisbane Roar at Suncorp Stadium
- Governing body: Football Queensland
- Representative team: Queensland
- Nicknames: soccer, football
- First played: 1867 in Brisbane
- Registered players: 217,749 (adult); 124,168 (child)

Audience records
- Single match: 51,153 (2014) Brisbane Roar vs Western Sydney Wanderers Suncorp Stadium 2014 A-League Grand Final (Lang Park, Brisbane)

Soccer was first played in Queensland on a regular basis in Brisbane, in 1884. It is the most participated team sport in the state with 341,917 players in 2024 just under a third of which are female. The game in Queensland is administered by the peak body, Football Queensland, together with several subordinate zone councils, each representing regions of Queensland.

== History ==
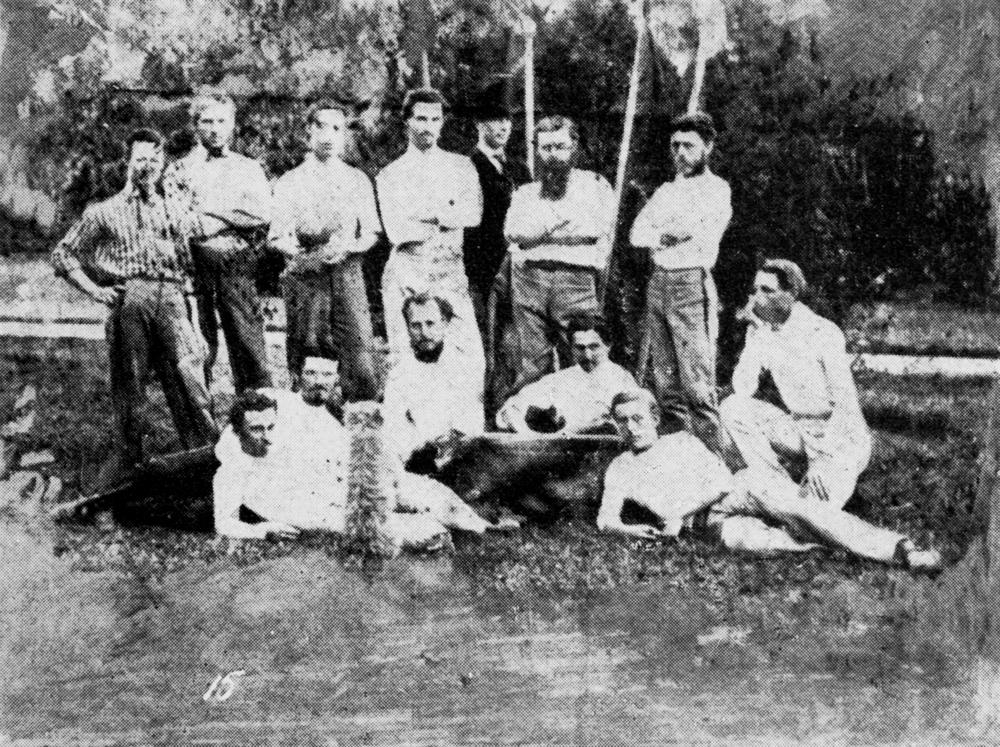
Brisbane team ca 1870 playing London Association (soccer) rules

The Brisbane Football Club (Queensland's first football club) formed in 1866 under Australian Rules football rules but dabbled in both soccer and rugby football for much of its history, but appears to have been involved in many of the early soccer matches in Brisbane from 1867 to 1870.

The earliest mention of matches under London Association rules is a July 1867 match Between Brisbane FC and the Volunteer Artillery World eleven. Volunteer Artillery later switched to Australian rules.

Brisbane FC also played soccer at Woogaroo (now Goodna), west of Brisbane, in 1875 against the inmates and warders of the Woogaroo Lunatic Asylum."

The following year at a meeting at the Railway Hotel, Petrie Terrace in April 1876, a new club was being formed in Brisbane to play under London Association rules is made with the intention of starting a neighbourhood league.

The Anglo-Queensland Football Association (a predecessor of Football Queensland) began in 1884. The Brisbane Courier reported in early May 1884:

A MEETING of those favourable to the "Association" game of football as played in the home countries was held at the Australian Hotel last night ... [I]t was resolved that it was desirable to form an Anglo-Queensland Football Association, and as a beginning the meeting formed the first club, the name selected being "St. Andrew's Football Club." ... It was announced that already from twenty-seven to thirty promises to join the club had been received, and it was resolved to play a practice match tomorrow afternoon, if possible, in the Queen's Park.

The first fixture match was played on 7 June 1884, on the Pineapple Sportsfield (now part of Raymond Park), Kangaroo Point (refer to History of association football in Brisbane, Queensland for more information).

By 1886, the game had spread west to Ipswich and then to other regional centres.

== Administration of football in Queensland ==
=== Football Queensland ===
Football Queensland was preceded by a number of organisations:

- 1884-1889: Anglo-Queensland Football Association
- 1890-1919: Queensland British Football Association
- 1920-1927: Queensland Football Association
- 1928-1939: Queensland Soccer Council
- 1940-1961: Queensland Soccer Football Association
- 1962-2005: Queensland Soccer Federation
- 2006-Present: Football Queensland

=== Queensland Zones ===
The game is administered locally by zone councils:

Zone	Site
Football Queensland Central Coast	
Football Queensland Darling Downs	
Football Queensland Far North & Gulf	
Football Queensland Metro North & South	
Football Queensland North	
Football Queensland South Coast	
Football Queensland Sunshine Coast	
Football Queensland Whitsunday Coast	
Football Queensland Wide Bay	

== Participation ==
Registered players
2021/22	211,923
2023/24	217,749

== National representation ==
=== National Soccer League (NSL) 1977-2004 ===
There were a number of Queensland teams that played in the now defunct National Soccer League.

Club name	Years in the NSL	Premierships	Cups
Brisbane City	1977-1986 (10)	--	1977, 1978
Brisbane Lions	1977-1986 & 1988 (10)	--	1981
Brisbane Strikers	1992-2004 (12)	1997	--

=== A-League (2005-present) ===
The Brisbane Roar, a privately owned football club (originally formed by the Brisbane-based Queensland Lions FC), was the only Queensland team to compete in the inaugural season of the national A-League (2005).

In the 2009-10 Hyundai A-League season, two other clubs joined the Roar, Gold Coast United FC and the North Queensland Fury FC (Townsville). However, the Fury team withdrew from the competition after season 2010-11, citing financial difficulties. Gold Coast United also left the A-league after the 2011-12 season. They have now reformed in August 2017 and currently compete in the National Premier Leagues Queensland.

== Club competitions ==
=== Queensland statewide competitions ===
The Queensland State League (QSL) was established in 2008 to provide a second tier competition between the A-League and the Queensland regional competitions. The QSL consisted of a single division, comprising nine teams without provision for promotion or relegation.

In 2013 the QSL was replaced by the National Premier Leagues Queensland (NPL Qld) which forms a division within the National Premier Leagues (NPL). The winner (top of the table after the regular season) enters a national finals series against the winners of the other NPL divisions. In 2018 the NPL Queensland will introduce promotion from and relegation to, a new league the Football Queensland Premier League.

=== Regional competitions ===
Below the NPL Qld there are local competitions run in each of the zones.

== Women's football ==
Brisbane Roar have a team in the national W-League that represent Queensland's female footballers.

== See also ==
- Football Queensland
- History of association football in Brisbane, Queensland
- Association football in Australia
