= 1884 Anglo-Queensland Football Association season =

Anglo-Queensland Football Association
- Season: 1884

The 1884 Anglo-Queensland Football Association season refers to the soccer competitions contested under the organisation of the Anglo-Queensland Football Association in 1884. Across the one senior cup, this was the first season of organised soccer in Queensland.

== Cup competitions ==
=== 1884 Anglo-Queensland FA Cup ===
1884 Anglo Queensland FA Cup
Tournament details
- Country: Australia
- Dates: 7 June – 19 July 1884
- Teams: 3

Final positions
- Champions: St Andrews (1st title)
- Runner-up: Rangers

Tournament statistics
- Matches played: 4
- Goals scored: 14 (3.5 per match)

The 1884 Anglo Queensland FA Cup was the first edition of the first soccer tournament in Australia, the Anglo Queensland FA Cup. The winners of the cup were the Rangers who defeated St Andrews 1–0 in the Final.

==== Teams ====
The Anglo Queensland FA Cup was a competition with three teams taking part in a round-robin tournament with the top two teams qualifying for the Final.

Round	Dates	Number of fixtures	Clubs remaining
Regular Season	7 June 1884 – 19 July 1884	3	3 → 2
Final	9 August 1884	1	2 → 1

==== Regular season ====
The regular season was played in a round-robin tournament of three teams with two qualifying for the Final. The two teams who advanced to the Final were St Andrews and Rangers.

Pos	Team	Pld	W	D	L	GF	GA	GD	Pts	Qualification
1	St Andrews	2	1	1	0	8	1	+7	3	Qualification for the Final
2	Rangers	2	1	1	0	4	2	+2	3	Qualification for the Final
3	Queens Park	2	0	0	2	1	10	−9	0	

Source: socceraust.co.uk
Rules for classification: 1) Points; 2) Goal difference; 3) Goals scored

7 June 1884	Queens Park	0–7	St Andrews

14 June 1884	St Andrews	1–1	Rangers

19 July 1884	Rangers	3–1	Queens Park

==== Final ====
9 August 1884

St Andrews	0–1	Rangers
