= Gold Coast A-League bid =

- Proposed name: Gold Coast United FC
- Status: Ongoing

Location
- Region: Gold Coast-Tweed Heads

Sport information
- Sport: Soccer
- League: A-League Men; A-League Women

The Gold Coast A-League bid is a venture by Gold Coast United to enter a team, representing the Gold Coast and Tweed Heads area, into the top tier of Australian football after the previous license held by Gold Coast United was revoked by the FFA. The bid utilises the same brand under license from the FFA (all A-League brands are held by the FFA) but is an entirely different model (being grass-roots driven) and a different set of owners.

== Gold Coast United ==
Gold Coast United FC was the Gold Coast's previous A-League team. The club was formed in mid-2008 by Queensland's richest man Clive Palmer. Palmer beat off a consortium bid led by real estate magnate Fred Taplin who had attempted to create "Gold Coast Galaxy FC", a club that would have had ties with MLS team LA Galaxy.

The club played during the 2009–10 A-League season playing out of Robina Stadium. Notable players included Socceroo Jason Culina, Socceroo Michael Thwaite and New Zealand international Shane Smeltz. Palmer's management of the club meant there was disruption within the club's administration as well as with the club's fans. The club lasted three seasons with Palmer's A-League licence being revoked before the end of the 2011–12 season.

The club had an average attendance of only 3,300 people in its final season. The club achieved moderate success, finishing third and fourth in its first two seasons. During its final season the club finished last, only winning four games.

=== Gold Coast United Reformation and A-League Bid ===
As part of the club's reformation, the club established a framework for a business-backed, community linked A-League club. Former Brisbane Roar CEO Eugenie Buckley had been working on an A-League bid and football plan commissioned by business group Sports Gold Coast with Gold Coast City Council. Her plan involved having a second Gold Coast NPL club that could feed to a potential A-League Gold Coast side. The Gold Coast eventually established a second NPL club in 2018.

The club’s catchment goes as far south as Coffs Harbour and encompasses Logan to the north. This is over one million people and by far the largest area in Australia without an A-League team. Brisbane Roar is currently in the process of building its base in Logan, which is also the home of Football Queensland however this is only a training and academy facility. This rivalry with Brisbane could work in Gold Coasts favour as the A-League has expressed a desire to see more derby matches in the A-League following the success of the Sydney Derby and Melbourne Derby and Brisbane Roar are currently the only A-League club in Queensland.

== Community engagement ==
The club has built the most successful academy in Queensland. Gold Coast United supplies the most players to the state and national teams of any club in Queensland and is one of 5 Gold Rated academies. Gold Coast United in 2019 was the only club to have 5 teams in the final series and together with Brisbane City FC, the only academy to have all teams reach the finals series.

=== Stadium ===
Whilst Robina Stadium – where the previous Gold Coast franchise played – could be a potential venue, the price and size of the stadium could be too large. A plan is being created for a 5,000–10,000 seat stadium for the Gold Coast region.

A stadium precinct could be created around Robina Stadium with three elite football pitches, one of which could feature a small boutique stadium. The stadium structure is being negotiated around the current NPL side, rather than a potential A-League side. Larger games or derby games could be playing inside Robina stadium.

== See also ==
- Expansion of the A-League
- Gold Coast United FC
