= 1884 in Australian soccer =

The 1884 season was the first season of regional competitive soccer in Australia and the Australian colonies. The Anglo-Queensland Football Association introduced the Anglo Queensland FA Cup in 1884 and the Anglo-Australian Football Association introduced the George and George Challenge Cup.

== Cup competitions ==
Federation	Competition	Winners	Runners-up	Venue	Result
Anglo-Queensland Football Association	Anglo-Queensland FA Cup	Rangers (1/0)	St Andrews (0/1)	–	1–0
Anglo-Australian Football Association	George and George Challenge Cup	Richmond (1/0)	South Melbourne (0/1)	–	3–0

(Note: figures in parentheses display the club's competition record as winners/runners-up.)

== See also ==
- Soccer in Australia
