= 1884 Anglo-Australian Football Association season =

Anglo-Australian Football Association
- Season: 1884

The 1884 Anglo-Australian Football Association season refers to the soccer competitions contested under the organisation of the Anglo-Australian Football Association in 1884. Across the one senior cup, this was the first season of organised soccer in Victoria.

== Cup competitions ==
=== 1884 George and George Challenge Cup ===
The George and George Challenge Cup was the first cup competition in Victoria. The 1884 George and George Challenge Cup was the first edition of the George and George Challenge Cup. The competition began on 31 May 1884 with four clubs Carlton, Prahran, Richmond and South Melbourne. The cup was won by Richmond who won 3–0 against South Melbourne in the Final on 16 August 1884.
