= FQPL Northern =

- Organising body: Football Queensland
- Founded: 2005; 21 years ago
- Country: Australia
- State: Queensland
- Confederation: AFC
- Number of clubs: 10 (across male and female)
- Level on pyramid: 5
- Domestic cup: Australia Cup
- Current champions: MA Olympic (2025)
- Current premiers: MA Olympic (2025)

FQPL Northern is the top association football league in the region of North Queensland, Australia. The current clubs are from Townsville, Ingham, and Ayr. Currently, FQPL Northern is in the fourth tier of football in Australia, the third tier of football in Queensland. The league is officially governed by Football Queensland North, and is overwatched by Football Queensland, the governing body for football in Queensland. The clubs compete in a regular season generally from April to September, and consist of a finals series.

The league was previously known as the North Queensland Premier League, before the Football Queensland Future of Football 2020+ reforms.

== Current clubs ==
2026 Season
As of 2026, FQPL Northern currently consists of the following clubs:

Team	FQPL Teams	Home Ground	Location	Est.
Brothers Townsville FC	Male/Female	Hi Vista Park	Mount Louisa	1967
Burdekin FC	Male	International Park	Ayr	1973
Estates FC	Male	Victoria Park	South Townsville	1927
MA Olympic FC	Male/Female	Olympic Park	Annandale	1967
Rebels FC	Male	Greenwood Park	Kirwan	1973
Riverway JCU FC	Male/Female	Joe Baker Field	Douglas	2021
Saints Eagles Souths FC	Male/Female	Aitkenvale Park	Aitkenvale	1971
Townsville Warriors FC	Male/Female	Melrose Park	Garbutt	1966
Wulguru United FC	Female	Wulguru Park	Wulguru	1967

== Past Champions ==
Despite there being premier competitions since the early twentieth century, results for this competition have only been tracked since 2011.

Team	Premierships	Grand Final
MA Olympic FC	9 (2011, 2013, 2015, 2016, 2019, 2021, 2022, 2024, 2025)	6 (2012, 2018, 2019, 2021, 2022, 2025)
Brothers Townsville FC	2 (2017, 2023)	4 (2014, 2017, 2023, 2024)
Saints Eagles Souths FC	1 (2020)	2 (2011, 2020)
Townsville Warriors FC	2 (2014, 2018)	1 (2015)
Rebels FC	1 (2012)	1 (2016)
Burdekin FC	-	1 (2013)
