= Mackay Wanderers FC =

Mackay Wanderers Football Club
- Full name: Mackay Wanderers; Football Club Inc
- Nickname: Reds
- Founded: 1923
- Ground: Wanderers Park, Ben Nevis Street
- Capacity: 1500
- League: FQPL Whitsunday Coast
- 2025: 5th of 6
Home colours	Away colours

The Mackay Wanderers are a football (soccer) club from Mackay, North Queensland, Australia, and compete in Football Whitsunday Coast competitions. Mackay Wanderers was established in 1923.
