= Football Queensland Central =

Governing body for association football in part of Queensland, Australia

Football Queensland Central Coast is the regional office of Football Queensland servicing the areas between Gladstone, Rockhampton and Longreach. The FQ Central Coast regional office has a local administrator and committee members which are elected by clubs to meet quarterly to discuss functional and geographical matters.

== History ==
Football Queensland Central Coast was established in 2021 as part of Football Queensland's Future of Football 2020+ Reforms. As part of the reform process, a six-month state-wide consultation with the local football community took place with the aim of improving four key areas of the game: Governance, Administration, Competitions, and Affordability. Following the consultation, FQ Central Coast was created to better reflect the geography and strategic direction of the region.

As part of this change, the Central Queensland Premier League was replaced by the FQPL Central Coast men's and women's competitions from the 2022 season.

== Clubs and competitions ==
The premier competitions in the region are the FQPL 3 Central Coast Men's and FQPL Central Coast Women's, both of which form part of the Central Conference in the Football Queensland pyramid.

FQPL 3 Central Coast
Club	Home Ground	Location	Notes
Berserker Bears FC	Norbridge Park	Rockhampton	Was CQU Berserker FC until 2022
Capricorn Coast FC	Apex Park	Yeppoon	
Central FC	Brian Niven Park	Gladstone	
Clinton FC	Clinton Field	Gladstone	
Frenchville FC	Ryan Park	Rockhampton	
Nerimbera FC	Pilbeam Park	Rockhampton	
Rockhampton Bluebirds United	Webber Park	Rockhampton	
Southside United Sports Club	Jardine Park	Rockhampton	

Accurate for 2024 season as of 26 August 2024

Central Coast Division 1 North
Club	Home Ground	Location	Notes
Berserker Bears FC	Norbridge Pak	Rockhampton	
Capricorn Coast FC Black	Apex Park	Yeppoon	
Capricorn Coast FC Orange	Apex Park	Yeppoon	
Frenchville FC Green	Ryan Park	Rockhampton	
Frenchville FC White	Ryan Park	Rockhampton	
Nerimbera FC	Pilbeam Park	Rockhampton	
Parkana	Parkana Field	Rockhampton	
Southside United Sports Club	Jardine Park	Rockhampton	

Accurate for 2023 season

Central Coast Division 1 South
Club	Home Ground	Location	Notes
**Biloela Valleys**		Biloela	
BITS FC		Gladstone	
**Calliope**		Gladstone	
Central FC	Brian Niven Park	Gladstone	
Clinton FC	Clinton Field	Gladstone	
**Yaralla**	Yaralla Sports Club Football Pitch	Gladstone	

Bold - denotes first-grade teamAccurate for 2023 season

Other Clubs
Club	Home Ground	Location	Notes
Boyne Tannum FC		Gladstone	
Berserker Southside	Jardine Park	Rockhampton	Combined team of Berserker and Southside United (2019, 2020). Withdrew prior to the 2021 Central Queensland Premier League season.
Callide United	Callide United Soccer Fields	Biloela	
Calliope & District FC		Gladstone	
Emerald Eagles FC		Emerald	Withdrew from senior competition after the 2016 Central Queensland Premier League season. Competed in Central Queensland Premier League Division 2 in 2018.
Gracemere Redbacks	Gracemere Sports Club Field	Rockhampton	Compete in Rockhampton Community League.
Monto SC		Monto	
St Anthony's Junior SC		Rockhampton	

== Competitions ==
=== Men's Premiers and Grand Final Winners (including the Wesley Hall Cup Winners) (1947 to 2025) ===
Season	Number of Teams	Premiers	Champions (Grand Final Winners) The Wesley Hall Cup	Grand Final Details
1947			Nerimbera (1st)	
1948			Nerimbera (2nd)	
1949			Nerimbera (3rd)	
1950			Frenchville (1st)	
1951			Nerimbera (4th)	
1952			Mt Morgan (1st)	
1953			Nerimbera (5th)	
1954			Nerimbera (6th)	
1955			Nerimbera (7th)	
1956			Nerimbera (8th)	
1957	3 - Nerimbera, Frenchville, Railway Recreation		Nerimbera (9th)	
1958	3 - Nerimbera, Frenchville, Railway Recreation		Frenchville (2nd)	
1959	4 - Frenchville, Nerimbera, Railway Recreation, "Bulletin" Dodgers		Railway Recreation (1st)	
1960			Frenchville (3rd)	Frenchville 1 defeated Nerimbera 0 at Rockhampton Showgrounds Frenchville - Neville Janes
1961			Railway Recreation (2nd)	
1962	3 - Frenchville, United Rangers, Callide Valley (Biloela)	Frenchville	United Rangers (1st)	United Rangers 5 defeated Frenchville 4 after extra time at Rockhampton Showgrounds. It was 4-all at full time.
1963		United Rangers	United Rangers (2nd)	United Rangers 3 defeated Railway Recreation 2 at North Rockhampton Cricket Ground United Rangers - Corbin, Own goal, Tim Gosbee (penalty) Railway Recreation - Peter Egan, Gentle
1964	4 - Railway Recreation, United Rangers, Nerimbera, Frenchville	Railway Recreation	Railway Recreation (3rd)	Railway Recreation 3 defeated Frenchville 1 at Rockhampton Cricket Ground Railway Recreation - Peter Egan (3) Frenchville - Garland
1965		Railway Recreation	Railway Recreation (4th)	Railway Recreation 1 defeated Frenchville 0 after extra time at the Rockhampton Cricket Ground. It was 0-all at full time. Railway Recreation - Peter Egan (penalty)
1966			Nerimbera (10th)	Nerimbera 5 defeated Railway Recreation 1 at Dean Street, Rockhampton Nerimbera - Charlie Combes (4), Barry Coombs Railway Recreation - Rowland
1967	4 - Frenchville, Gladstone United, Nerimbera, Railway Recreation	Railway Recreation	Nerimbera (11th)	Nerimbera 5 defeated Railway Recreation 2 at Dean Street, Rockhampton
1968		Railway Recreation	Railway Recreation (5th)	Railway Recreation 2 defeated Gladstone United 1 Railway Recreation - Peter Egan, Kel Higson Gladstone United - Nick Demchenko
1969	5 - Railway Recreation, Nerimbera, Frenchville, Gladstone United, Mt Morgan	Railway Recreation (Undefeated)	Railway Recreation (6th)	Railway Recreation 3 defeated Nerimbera 2 at Dean Street, Rockhampton Railway Recreation - John Jarvis, Unknown (2) Nerimbera - Own goal, Unknown
1970	4 - Frenchville, Gladstone United, Railway Recreation, Nerimbera	Railway Recreation	Railway Recreation (7th)	Railway Recreation 3 defeated Nerimbera 1 Railway Recreation - John Jarvis (2), Brian Egan Nerimbera - S Bellis (penalty)
1971	6 - Frenchville, Railway Recreation, Nerimbera, Bluebirds United, Gladstone United, Biloela. Gladstone United and Biloela withdrew from the competition part way through the season.	Frenchville	Frenchville (4th)	Frenchville 6 defeated Bluebirds United 1 at McLeod Park, Rockhampton Frenchville - Wayne Druery (4), Dennis Day, Dave Kinsella Bluebirds United - Own goal Player of the Grand Final - Dave Kinsella (Frenchville)
1972	4 - Railway Recreation, Frenchville, Nerimbera, Bluebirds United	Railway Recreation	Frenchville (5th)	Frenchville 3 defeated Bluebirds United 1 at McLeod Park, Rockhampton Frenchville - Steve Byron (penalty), Paul Martin, Wayne Druery Bluebirds United - Bruce Shuker
1973		Frenchville	Frenchville (6th)	Frenchville 4 defeated Nerimbera 1 at McLeod Park, Rockhampton Frenchville - Len Pollock (2 including a penalty), Graeme Brady, Paul Martin Nerimbera - Smythe
1974	4 - Bluebirds United, Frenchville, Nerimbera, St George	Bluebirds United (1st)	Bluebirds United (1st)	Bluebirds United 5 defeated Frenchville 4 after extra time. It was 4-all at full time. This game was played at McLeod Park, Rockhampton. Bluebirds United - Terry McPherson (3 including 1 during extra time), Cornwell, Peter Pirog Frenchville - Nick Jones (2), Own goal, Len Pollock
1975		Bluebirds United (2nd)	Bluebirds United (2nd)	Bluebirds United 3 defeated Frenchville 2 after extra time. It was 2-all at full time. Bluebirds United - Julian Parker, Terry McPherson (2 including one during extra time) Frenchville - Mal Cross (penalty), Ian Graham
1976	5 - Bluebirds United, Frenchville, St George, Nerimbera, Capricornia Institute of Advanced Education	Bluebirds United (3rd)	Bluebirds United (3rd)	Bluebirds United 1 defeated Frenchville 0 at McLeod Park, Rockhampton Bluebirds United - Peter Pirog
1977	6 - Bluebirds United, Wolves, Leichhardt United, St George, Frenchville, Nerimbera	Bluebirds United (4th)	Bluebirds United (4th)	Bluebirds United 4 defeated Wolves 1 at McLeod Park, Rockhampton Bluebirds United - Alfie McDonaugh (2), Alan Caird, Rodney Leis Wolves - John Druery
1978	7 - Frenchville, Nerimbera, Bluebirds United, St George, Berserker, Capricornia Institute of Advanced Education, Leichhardt United	Frenchville	Frenchville (7th)	Frenchville 2 defeated Bluebirds United 1 at McLeod Park, Rockhampton Frenchville - Wayne Druery (2) Bluebirds United - Greg McMillan
1979	6 - Frenchville, Nerimbera, St George, Bluebirds United, Berserker, Capricornia Institute of Advanced Education	Frenchville	Nerimbera (12th)	Nerimbera 4 defeated Frenchville 0 at McLeod Park, Rockhampton Nerimbera - John Jarvis (2), D McGahan, Colin Ward
1980	6 - Nerimbera, Bluebirds United, Leichhardt United, Frenchville, St George, Berserker	Nerimbera	Leichhardt United (1st)	Leichhardt United 3 defeated Bluebirds United 2 after extra time at McLeod Park, Rockhampton. It was 2-all at full time. Leichhardt United - Glen Moss, Jeff Feltell (penalty), Rob O'Grady (in extra time) Bluebirds United - Lee McBride, Greg McMillan (penalty)
1981	8 - Nerimbera, Frenchville, Leichhardt United, St George, Yeppoon, Bluebirds United, Blackwater, Berserker	Nerimbera (Undefeated)	Nerimbera (13th)	Grand Final - Nerimbera 0 drew with Frenchville 0 after extra time at McLeod Park, Rockhampton Grand Final Replay - Nerimbera 3 defeated Frenchville 1 at McLeod Park, Rockhampton Nerimbera - Steve "Jack" Frost, John Jarvis, Ian Stuart Frenchville - John Druery (penalty)
1982		Nerimbera	Nerimbera (14th)	Nerimbera 2 defeated Frenchville 1 after extra time at McLeod Park, Rockhampton. It was nil-all at full time. Nerimbera - John Neibling (during extra time), Own goal (during extra time) Frenchville - Bill Gillespie (during extra time)
1983	9 - Frenchville, Nerimbera, Clinton, Wolves (Gladstone), St George, Bluebirds United, QLD Alumina Sports Club, Capicornia Institute of Advanced Education, Gladstone United	Frenchville	Frenchville (8th)	Frenchville 2 defeated St George 1 at Ryan Park, Rockhampton Frenchville - Brett Druery, Bevan Dingley St George - Darryl Brown
1984	12 - Frenchville, Mackay Rangers, Mackay Lions, Parkside (Mackay), St George, Nerimbera, Clinton, Bluebirds United, Wolves (Gladstone), Mackay Wanderers, QLD Alumina Sports Club, Gladstone United	Frenchville	Frenchville (9th)	Frenchville 2 defeated St George 0 at Norbridge Park, Rockhampton Frenchville - Brett Druery, Doug Swain
1985	7 - Berserker, Frenchville, Nerimbera, Capricornia Institute of Advanced Education, Bluebirds United, Leichhardt United, St George,	Berserker (Undefeated) (1st)	Berserker (1st)	Grand Final - Berserker 3 drew with Frenchville 3 after extra time at Norbridge Park, Rockhampton. It was 2-all at full time. Berserker - Jim Gough, Brad Smith, Adrian Smith (in extra time) Frenchville - Adrian Weston, Myles Hunt, Lindsay Dean (in extra time) Grand Final Replay - Berserker 3 defeated Frenchville 2 after extra time at Ryan Park, Rockhampton. It was 1-all at full time. Berserker - Brad Smith, Warren Jarvis (in extra time), Bruce Bock (in extra time) Frenchville - John Kruk (penalty), Myles Hunt (in extra time)
1986	6 - Berserker, Nerimbera, Capricornia Institute of Advanced Education, Frenchville, Bluebirds United, Southside United	Berserker (2nd)	Frenchville (10th)	Frenchville 1 defeated Bluebirds United 0 at Norbridge Park, Rockhampton Frenchville - Ian Glazebrook
1987	6 - Frenchville, Bluebirds United, Southside United, Parkana, Berserker, Nerimbera	Frenchville	Bluebirds United (5th)	Grand Final - Bluebirds United 0 drew with Frenchville 0 after extra time at Norbridge Park, Rockhampton Grand Final Replay - Bluebirds United 1 defeated Frenchville 0 at Norbridge Park, Rockhampton Bluebirds United - Gavin Whitehead
1988	9 - Frenchville, Mackay Rangers, Mackay Magpies, Bluebirds United, Mackay Lions, Berserker, Nerimbera, Mackay Wanderers, Wests (Mackay)		Frenchville (11th)	Frenchville 4 defeated Nerimbera 1 at Ryan Park, Rockhampton Frenchville - Gavin Jenkins, Paul Ash, Craig Dingley, Darryl Kerr Nerimbera - Darren England
1989	5 - Frenchville, Nerimbera, Southside United, Berserker, Bluebirds United		Frenchville (12th)	Frenchville 3 defeated Nerimbera 1 Frenchville - Jason Wyer (2), Craig Green Nerimbera - Shaun Jones
1990	5 - Frenchville, Bluebirds United, Nerimbera, Berserker, Southside United	Frenchville	Bluebirds United (6th)	Bluebirds United
1991	4 - Bluebirds United, Frenchville, Nerimbera, Berserker	Bluebirds United	Bluebirds United (7th)	Bluebirds United 1 defeated Frenchville 0 at Ryan Park, Rockhampton Bluebirds United - Andrew Grohn
1992	4 - Berserker, Bluebirds United, Frenchville, Nerimbera	Berserker (3rd)	Berserker (2nd)	Berserker 1 defeated Bluebirds United 0 at Norbridge Park, Rockhampton Berserker - Warren Jarvis
1993	9 - Berserker, Bluebirds United (Blue), Bluebirds United (White), Central QLD University, Emu Park, Frenchville, Nerimbera, Parkana, Southside United	Berserker (4th)	Berserker (3rd)	Berserker 2 defeated Bluebirds United 0 at Ryan Park, Rockhampton Berserker - Brad Smith (2)
1994	10 - Berserker, Bluebirds United (Blue), Bluebirds United (White), Capricorn Coast, Callide Valley (Biloela), Frenchville, Nerimbera, Parkana, Southside United, University of Central QLD	Berserker (5th)	Frenchville (13th)	Frenchville 2 defeated Berserker 1 at Ryan Park, Rockhampton Frenchville - Jason Wyer, Lindsay Dean Berserker - Michael Rowland
1995	8 - Nerimbera, Berserker, Southside United, Frenchville, Capricorn Coast, Bluebirds United, Central QLD University, Parkana	Nerimbera	Nerimbera (15th)	Nerimbera 3 defeated Frenchville 1 after extra time at Ryan Park, Rockhampton. It was 1-all at full time. Nerimbera - Michael Bettridge (2 including a goal in extra time), John Muir (in extra time) Frenchville - Jason Wyer
1996	8 - Nerimbera, Frenchville, Central QLD University, Capricorn Coast, Berserker, Bluebirds United, Southside United, Parkana	Nerimbera	Frenchville (14th)	Frenchville 1 defeated Bluebirds United 0 at Webber Park, Rockhampton Frenchville - Jeff James
1997	8 - Nerimbera Brothers, Berserker, Frenchville, University of Central QLD, Bluebirds United, Southside United, Capricorn Coast, Parkana	Frenchville	Frenchville (15th)	Frenchville 2 defeated Nerimbera Brothers 1 at Ryan Park, Rockhampton Frenchville - Jason Wyer, Craig Green Nerimbera Brothers - Pharon Willie
1998	6 - Nerimbera Brothers, Berserker, Frenchville, Central QLD University, Bluebirds United, Southside United	Nerimbera Brothers	Frenchville (16th)	Frenchville 4 defeated Nerimbera Brothers 2 at Victoria Park, Rockhampton Frenchville - Jason Wyer (2), Kevin Burns, Luke Edwards Nerimbera Brothers - Pharon Willie, Ricky England
1999	6 - Berserker, Nerimbera Brothers, Frenchville, Southside United, Bluebirds United, Central Highlands	Berserker (6th)	Berserker (4th)	Berserker 1 defeated Nerimbera Brothers 0 at Victoria Park Berserker - Jeff Capell
2000	7 - Berserker, Frenchville, Southside United, Nerimbera, Clinton, Bluebirds United, Valleys (Biloela)	Berserker (7th)	Frenchville (17th)	Frenchville 5 defeated Berserker 1 at Ryan Park, Rockhampton Frenchville - Craig Green (2), Dane Smith, Steve Peters, Luke Edwards Berserker - Unknown Player of the Grand Final - Troy Rowland (Frenchville)
2001	7 - Frenchville, Berserker, Nerimbera Brothers, Southside United, Clinton, Bluebirds United, Capricorn Coast	Frenchville	Berserker (5th)	Berserker 3 defeated Frenchville 0 at Ryan Park, Rockhampton Berserker - Craig Porter, Anthony Galliozzi, Matthew Bettridge Player of the grand final - Matthew Bettridge (Berserker)
2002	TBC - CQU Berserker, Nerimbera Brothers, Frenchville, Clinton	CQU Berserkers	Frenchville (18th)	Frenchville 2 defeated CQU Berserker 0 at Jardine Park, Rockhampton Frenchville - Willie Jensen (2) Player of the grand final - Willie Jensen (Frenchville)
2003			Nerimbera Brothers (16th)	Nerimbera Brothers 4 defeated CQU Berserker 2 at Jardine Park, Rockhampton Nerimbera Brothers - Jade Sinclair (2), Wayne Lauga, Mark Hickson CQU Berserker - Mitch Williams, Dane Tappenden Player of the match - Darrell Graham (Nerimbera Brothers)
2004	9 - Frenchville, CQU Berserker, Nerimbera Brothers, Central (Gladstone), Southside United, Bluebirds United, Clinton, Capricorn Coast, Parkana	Frenchville	CQU Berserker (6th)	CQU Berserker 2 defeated Frenchville 1 CQU Berserker - Mich Williams (2 including a penalty) Frenchville - Kenton Robertson Player of the match - Tim Grieves (CQU Berserker)
2005		Frenchville	Frenchville (19th)	Frenchville 1 defeated Nerimbera Brothers 0 at Jardine Park, Rockhampton Frenchville - Dane Howard
2006	9 - Clinton, Frenchville, Nerimbera, Southside United, Bluebirds United, Berserker, Capricorn Coast, Central (Gladstone), Parkana	Clinton	Frenchville (20th)	Frenchville 2 defeated Nerimbera 1 at Jardine Park, Rockhampton Frenchville - Tim Hickey (penalty), Michael Cardillo Nerimbera - Jade Sinclair (penalty)
2007		Capricorn Coast	Capricorn Coast (1st)	Capricorn Coast defeated Bluebirds United 9-8 on penalties after extra time at Apex Park, Yeppoon. It was 2-all at full time and 3-all after extra time. Capricorn Coast - Cameron Mackay (2 including 1 during extra time), Brad Stevens Bluebirds United - Brendan James, Matthew Sauer, Peter Degroot (in extra time) Player of the Grand Final - Dylan Kussrow (Capricorn Coast)
2008		Clinton	Southside United (1st)	Southside United 2 defeated Clinton 1 at Jardine Park, Rockhampton Southside United - Josh Lucey (2) Clinton - Own goal
2009		Clinton	Clinton (1st)	Clinton 7 defeated Bluebirds United 1 at Marley Brown Oval, Gladstone Clinton - Ryan Bellert (3), Shaun Petrie, Aaron Duffy, Matt Hills, Chris Hill Bluebirds United - Nathan Fairley (penalty)
2010	11 - Capricorn Coast, Clinton, Nerimbera, Bluebirds United, Frenchville, Yaralla, Centrals, Parkana, Southside United, CQU Berserker, Wildcats	Capricorn Coast	Capricorn Coast (2nd)	Capricorn Coast 2 defeated Clinton 0 at Apex Park, Yeppoon Capricorn Coast - Jonathon Sauer (penalty), Dan Spyve
2011		Clinton	Central (Gladstone) (1st)	Central (Gladstone) 1 defeated Clinton 0 at Clinton Park, Gladstone Central (Gladstone) - Jordan Donald Player of the Grand Final - Garth Lawrie (Central (Gladstone))
2012			Clinton (2nd)	Clinton 7 defeated Nerimbera 1 at Ryan Park, Rockhampton Clinton - Tyler Stross (3), Brendan Hancock (2), Ryan Bellert, Matt Smillie Nerimbera - Finn Mackenzie Player of the match (selected by the referees) - Matt Smillie (Clinton) Player of the match (selected by Clinton) - Brendan Hancock (Clinton)
2013	10 - Frenchville, Clinton, Central, Nerimbera, Bluebirds United, Central QLD Energy, Southside United, Emerald, Capricorn Coast, Berserker	Frenchville	Frenchville (21st)	Frenchville 4 defeated Clinton 3 at Jardine Park, Rockhampton Frenchville - Michael Cay (2), Paul Jackson, Jesse Thompson Clinton - Scott Rouse, Marc Wheeler, Mitchell Innocend
2014	9 - Southside United, Frenchville, Clinton, Capricorn Coast, Bluebirds United, Central, Nerimbera, Emerald, Berserker	Southside United	Frenchville (22nd)	Frenchville 3 defeayed Clinton 0 at Ryan Park, Rockhampton Frenchville - F King, T Hickey, D Trim
2015	8 - Frenchville, Clinton, Capricorn Coast, Southside United, Bluebirds United, Berserker, Emerald, Nerimbera	Frenchville	Frenchville (23rd)	Frenchville 5 defeated Clinton 2 at Ryan Park, Rockhampton Frenchville - Michael Cay (2 including a penalty), Jordan Miller (2), Michael Freeman, Clinton - Own goals (2) Player of the Grand Final - Jordan Miller (Frenchville)
2016	9 - Frenchville, Clinton, Capricorn Coast, Southside United, Bluebirds United, Parkana, Nerimbera, Berserker, Emerald	Frenchville (Undefeated)	Frenchville (24th)	Frenchville 6 defeated Clinton 5 after extra time at Apex Park, Yeppoon. It was 4-all at full time. Frenchville - Jordan Miller (3), Paul Jackson, Jesse Thompson (in extra time), Michael Cay (in extra time) Clinton - Ethan Munster, Josh Noonan, Unknown (2), Unknown (in extra time) Player of the Grand Final - Jordan Miller (Frenchville)
2017	7 - Capricorn Coast, Clinton, Frenchville, Bluebirds United, Southside United, Parkana, Nerimbera	Capricorn Coast	Capricorn Coast (3rd)	Capricorn Coast 4 defeated Frenchville 3 at Apex Park, Yeppoon Capricorn Coast - Ben Cummins (2), Tim English, Flynn Berry Frenchville - Jordan Miller (2 including a penalty), Paul Jackson
2018	7 - Clinton, Frenchville, Capricorn Coast, Central, Bluebirds United, Southside United, Nerimbera	Clinton	Clinton (3rd)	Clinton 1 defeated Capricorn Coast 0 after extra time. It was 0-all at full time. Clinton - Liam Jones
2019	7 - Capricorn Coast, Frenchville, Clinton, Bluebirds United, Central, Nerimbera, Southside United	Capricorn Coast	Frenchville (25th)	Frenchville 3 defeated Capricorn Coast 2 after extra time at Ryan Park, Rockhampton. It was 2-all at full time. Frenchville - Harry Dean (2 including 1 during extra time), Shane Lubbe (during extra time) Capricorn Coast - To be advised Player of the Grand Final - Harry Dean (Frenchville)
2020	6 - Frenchville, Bluebirds United, Central, Berserker Southside, Nerimbera, Capricorn Coast	Frenchville	Frenchville (26th)	Frenchville 2 defeated Bluebirds United 1
2021	6 - Frenchville, Capricorn Coast, Clinton, Bluebirds United, Nerimbera, Central	Frenchville	Frenchville (27th)	Frenchville defeated Clinton 7-6 on penalties after extra time. It was 2-all after extra time.
2022	6 - Clinton, Frenchville, Central, Southside United, Nerimbera, Capricorn Coast	Clinton	Frenchville (28th)	Frenchville 1 defeated Clinton 0 at Ryan Park, Rockhampton Frenchville - Harry Dean
2023	9 - Clinton, Frenchville, Nerimbera, Central, Southside United, Capricorn Coast, Parkana, Berserker, Bluebirds United	Clinton (Undefeated)	Clinton (4th)	Clinton 3 defeated Nerimbera 0 at Club Clinton Park, Gladstone Clinton - Liam Stephen, Matthew Varnes, Scott Rouse
2024	8 - Clinton (Gladstone), Frenchville, Central, Nerimbera, Southside United, Capricorn Coast, CQU Berserker, Bluebirds United	Clinton	Clinton (5th)	Clinton 3 defeated Frenchville 1 at Marley Brown Oval, Gladstone Clinton - Ethan Munster, Jake Schofield, Liam Stephen Frenchville - Tyler Wetzler
2025	7 - Clinton (Gladstone), Frenchville, Central (Gladstone), Capricorn Coast), Nerimbera, Berserker, Bluebirds United	Clinton	Clinton (6th)	Clinton 2 defeated Frenchville 0 at Ryan Park, Rockhampton Clinton - Ethan Munster, Unknown
2026	8- Clinton (Gladstone), Frenchville, Central (Gladstone), Capricorn Coast), Nerimbera, Berserker, Bluebirds United,BITS (Boyne Island Tannum Sands)	Clinton	Clinton (7th)	Clinton defeated Frenchville 3-0 at Marley Brown. 3 Goals in final 15 minutes.

== See also ==
- Football Queensland
