= Football Queensland North =

Association Football in North Queensland

Football Queensland Northern is a Football Queensland licensed zone which operates soccer competitions within the cities and shires of Townsville, Ingham, and Ayr. Junior competitions are regularly only inclusive of Townsville clubs, however Ayr and Ingham run their own junior programs.

== Football Queensland Northern ==
Football Queensland Northern is responsible for running the North Queensland Premier League, and all other Junior and Senior competitions in the area. They are also responsible for all refereeing, coaching, and playing programs in the region. Most clubs offer both male and female football. Football Queensland Northern was formerly known as Townsville Football, and changed for governance purposes in 2018.

== Men's Premiers and Knock Out Cup/Champions (Grand Final Winners) ==
Men's Premiers and Knock Out Cup/Champions (Grand Final Winners)
| Season | Premiers | Number of Clubs | Knock Out Cup Winners | To be used for Notes/Scorers in the Knock Out Cup Final/Grand Final |
|---|---|---|---|---|
| 1931 | Souths United | 4 - Souths United, Power House, Pastimes, Rovers | | |
| 1932 | Souths United defeated Power House 2-0 in a premiership play-off | 6 - Souths United, Power House, Pastimes, Rovers, Commonwealths (also referred as Commercials), Wanderers | | |
| 1934 | Estates | | | |
| 1935 | Estates | | | |
| 1936 | Pastimes | | | |
| 1937 | Estates | | | |
| 1938 | Powerhouse | 4 - Estates, Pastimes, Powerhouse, S & B | | |
| 1939 | | 4 - Powerhouse, Estates, Roxy, S&B | | |
| 1940 | Estates | | | |
| 1945 | Army | 4 - Army, RAAF 1, RAAF 2, Rovers | | |
| 1946 | | 5 - Estates, Rovers, Tigers, Trojans, Watersiders | | |
| 1947 | | 6 - Estates, Rovers, Tigers l, Tigers ll, Trojans, Watersiders | | |
| 1948 | Rovers | | | |
| 1949 | Souths United | | | |
| 1950 | Trojans | 6 - Legionnaires, RIPS, Rovers, Souths United, Trojans, YMCA | | |
| 1951 | Trojans | 8 - Trojans, Souths United, Rovers 1, RIPS, YMCA 1, Estates, Rovers 2, YMCA 2 | | |
| 1952 | Estates | 7 - Estates, RIPS, Rovers, Souths United, Torchbearers, Trojans, YMCA | | |
| 1953 | Estates (Undefeated) | 5 - Estates, RAAF, RIPS, Rovers, Souths United | Souths United | |
| 1954 | Estates | 5 - Estates, RAAF, RIPS, Rovers, Souths United | Souths United | Example |
| 1955 | | | | |
| 1956 | Souths United | | | |
| 1957 | | 5 - Estates, Idalia Rovers, RIPS, Rovers, Souths United | | |
| 1958 | Estates | 5 - Estates, Idalia Rovers, RIPS, Rovers, Souths United | | |
| 1959 | Estates | 6 - Estates, Idalia Rovers, Internationals, Souths United, Rovers, RIPS | Estates | Estates 5 defeated Idalia Rovers 2 Estates - G Evans (2), Johnson, Unknown Idalia Rovers - Hughie Shields (penalty), Unknown |
| 1960 | Internationals (1st) | 5 - Internationals, RIPS, Estates, Idalia Rovers, Rovers | | |
| 1961 | Estates | 5 - Estates, Internationals, Parkside, RIPS, Rovers | | |
| 1962 | Rovers | 5 - Estates, Olympics, Parkside, RIPS, Rovers | | |
| 1963 | RIPS (Undefeated) | 5 - Estates, Olympic, Parkside, RIPS, Rovers | | |
| 1964 | RIPS | | | |
| 1965 | RIPS | 5 - Crosskeys United, Estates, Olympic, RIPS, Rovers | | |
| 1966 | Roma (Ingham) | 8 - Ayr, Crosskeys United, Estates, Home Hill, Ingham Rangers, RIPS, Roma (Ingham), Olympics | | |
| 1967 | RIPS (A) | Tbc | | |
| 1968 | Olympic (2nd) | Tbc | | |
| 1969 | Roma (Ingham) (Undefeated) | 6 - Roma (Ingham), Olympic, RIPS, Rangers (Ingham), Estates, Idalia Rovers | | |
| 1970 | Roma (Ingham) | 8 - Estates, Idalia Rovers, Ingham Rangers, Olympic, RIPS, Roma (Ingham), University, Warriors | Olympic (1st) | Olympic 5 defeated Roma (Ingham) 0 Olympic - Graham O'Callaghan (2), Alexander "Sandy" Kay, Dave Smith, Roy "Rocky" Birtles |
| 1971 | Estates | 7 - Estates, Olympic, Roma (Ingham), RIPS, Idalia Rovers, Warriors, University | Estates (1st) | Estates 3 defeated Olympic 1 Estates - Keith Brett (2), Trevor Harries (to be confirmed) Olympic - Unknown |
| 1972 | Olympic (3rd) | 7 - Army United, Estates, Idalia Rovers, Olympic, Polonia, RIPS, Roma (Ingham) | Olympic (2nd) | Olympic 3 defeated Estates 1 Olympic - Steen Jensen, Ian Melville, R Walker Estates - Jock McCann |
| 1973 | Olympic (4th) | 8 - Olympics, Estates, Polonia, Aitkenvale, Warriors, RIPS, Army United, Ayr | Olympic (3rd) | Olympic 1 defeated Estates 0 Olympic - Clive Dyson |
| 1974 | Olympic (5th) | 9 - Aitkenvale, Ayr, Estates, Mt Stuart Army United, Olympic, Polonia, Rebels, RIPS, Warriors, | Olympic (4th) | Olympic 1 defeated Ayr 0 Olympic - Ray Stark |
| 1975 | Olympic (6th) | 8 - Olympic, Estates, Ayr, Polonia, Rebels, Army, Aitkenvale, Roma (Ingham) | Estates (2nd) | Estates 3 defeated Olympic 1 Estates - Wayne Bye (2), Hugh Montgomery Olympic - Alf Sarinas |
| 1976 | Ayr (1st) | 8 - Ayr, Estates, Rebels, Olympic, Polonia, Mt Stuart (Army), Aitkenvale, RIPS | Estates (3rd) | Estates 2 defeated Olympic 1 Estates - Wayne Bye (penalty), Ian Crichton Olympic - Paul Trovalusci |
| 1977 | Olympic (7th) | 8 - Olympic, Ayr, Rebels, Polonia, Estates, Warriors, Aitkenvale, Mt Stuart | Ayr (1st) | Ayr 2 defeated Olympic 1 Ayr - Glen Dawes, Jeff Payard (penalty) Olympic - Hugh Montgomery Player of the match - Jeff Payard (Ayr) |
| 1978 | Olympic (8th) | 8 - Olympic, Heatley Warriors, Ayr, Polonia, Estates, Aitkenvale, Roma, Rebels | Olympic (5th) | Olympic 3 defeated Ayr 2 Olympic - Dave Searston (2 including a penalty), Bob Prosser, Ayr - Russell Searle (2) |
| 1979 | Olympic (9th) | 8 - Aitkenvale, Ayr, Brothers, Estates, Olympic, Polonia, Roma, Warriors | Estates (4th) | Grand Final - Estates 1 drew with Olympic 1 Estates - Carlo Vitale Olympic - Bob Prosser Grand Final Replay - Estates 2 defeated Olympic 1 Estates - Andrew Namok, Hugh Campbell Olympic - Bob Prosser |
| 1980 | Aitkenvale (1st) | 8 - Aitkenvale, Brothers, Olympic, Ayr, Warriors, Rebels, Estates, Eagles United | Aitkenvale (1st) | Aitkenvale 1 defeated Olympic 0 Aitkenvale - Mick Jones |
| 1981 | Estates | 8 - Estates, Brothers, Herbert Valley (Ingham), Warriors, Aitkenvale, Ayr, Olympic, Eagles United | Herbert Valley (Ingham) (1st) | Grand Final - Herbert Valley 1 drew with Brothers 1 Herbert Valley - Colin Pane Brothers - John Padgett Grand Final Replay - Herbert Valley 5 defeated Brothers 1 Herbert Valley - Colin Pane (2), Roger Clark, David Gonano, Russell Pearce Brothers - John Padgett (penalty) |
| 1982 | Ayr (2nd) | 8 - Ayr, Aitkenvale, Herbert Valley (Ingham), Estates, Olympic, Warriors, Brothers, Rebels | Aitkenvale (2nd) | Aitkenvale 4 defeated Estates 0 Aitkenvale - Stephen Beard (3), Rob Lawson (penalty) |
| 1983 | Estates | 8 - Estates, Aitkenvale, Ayr, Brothers, Olympic, Warriors, Herbert Valley (Ingham), Idalia Rovers | Estates (5th) | Estates 2 defeated Aitkenvale 1 |
| 1984 | Aitkenvale (2nd) | 8 - Aitkenvale, Olympic, Estates, Warriors, Brothers, Ayr, Herbert Valley, Internationals | Aitkenvale (3rd) | Aitkenvale 1 defeated Olympic 0 Aitkenvale - Ron Tong (penalty) |
| 1985 | Aitkenvale (3rd) | 8 | Mundingburra Olympic United (6th) | Grand Final - Mundingburra Olympic United 1 drew with Aitkenvale 1 Mundingburra Olympic United - Own goal Aitkenvale - Phil Figgins Grand Final Replay - Mundingburra Olympic United 2 defeated Aitkenvale 1 Mundingburra Olympic United - David Pollock (2) Aitkenvale - Barry Edgar |
| 1986 | Mundingburra Olympic United (10th) | 8 | Mundingburra Olympic United (7th) | Grand Final - Mundingburra Olympic United 0 drew with Ayr 0 Grand Final Replay - Mundingburra Olympic United 1 defeated Ayr 0 Mundingburra Olympic United - Robert Parkes |
| 1987 | Mundingburra Olympic United (11th) | 8 - Aitkenvale, Ayr, Brothers, Estates, Mundingburra Olympic United, Souths Wallaroos, Townsville Warriors, Wulguru-Stuart-Cluden | Aitkenvale (4th) | Aitkenvale 2 defeated Mundingburra Olympic United 1 Aitkenvale - Craig Collins, Barry Edgar Mundingburra Olympic United - Mal Quantrill |
| 1988 | Estates (Undefeated) | 10 - Estates, Brothers, Mundingburra Olympic United, Aitkenvale PYC, Wulguru-Stuart-Cluden, Burdekin (Ayr), Souths Wallaroos, Warriors, Polonia, Thuringowa City | Estates (5th) | Estates 2 defeated Brothers 0 Estates - Eric Abel, Brett Wilson |
| 1989 | Aitkenvale PYC (Police Youth Club) (4th) | 10 | Mundingburra Olympic United (8th) | Grand Final - Mundingburra Olympic United 1 drew with Aitkenvale PYC 1 Mundingburra Olympic United - Own goal Aitkenvale PYC - Chris James Grand Final Replay - Mundingburra Olympic United 3 defeated Aitkenvale PYC 0 Mundingburra Olympic United - Mal Quantrill (2), Ian Jones |
| 1990 | Aitkenvale PYC (Police Youth Club) (5th) | 10 - Aitkenvale PYC, Brothers, Burdekin (Ayr), Heatley Warriors, Herbert Valley (Ingham), Estates, Mundingburra Olympic United, Polonia, Wulguru-Stuart-Cluden | Mundingburra Olympic United (9th) | Mundingburra Olympic United 2 defeated Estates 0 Mundingburra Olympic United - Mal Quantrill (2) Player of the match - Keith Royle (Mundingburra Olympic United) |
| 1991 | Mundingburra Olympic United (12th) | 10 - Mundingburra Olympic United, Estates, Burdekin (Ayr), Brothers, Wulguru, Aitkenvale United, Souths Wallaroos, Polonia, Herbert Valley (Ingham), Heatley Warriors | Mundingburra Olympic United (10th) | Mundingburra Olympic United 2 defeated Estates 1 Mundingburra Olympic United - David Pollock (2) Estates - Ricky Brownlie |
| 1992 | Aitkenvale United (6th) | 10 - Aitkenvale United, Mundingburra Olympic United, Burdekin (Ayr), Wulguru Stuart Cluden, Brothers, Estates, Heatley Warriors, Herbert Valley, Souths Wallaroos, Polonia | Brothers (1st) | Brothers 2 defeated Mundingburra Olympic United 1 Brothers - Tim McAuliffe, John Herring Mundingburra Olympic United - Felix Gabiola |
| 1993 | Heatley Warriors (1st) | 6 - Aitkenvale United, Brothers, Burdekin (Ayr), Heatley Warriors, Mundingburra Olympic United, Wulguru | Burdekin (Ayr) (2nd) | Burdekin (Ayr) 2 defeated Wulguru 1 after extra time. It was 1-all at full time. |
| 1994 | Wulguru-Stuart-Cluden (1st) | 6 - Wulguru-Stuart-Cluden, Aitkenvale United, Heatley Warriors, Mundingburra Olympic United, Brothers, Burdekin Parkside (Ayr) | Wulguru-Stuart-Cluden (1st) | Wulguru-Stuart-Cluden 2 defeated Heatley Warriors 1 Wulguru-Stuart-Cluden - Brett Wilson, Steven Silver Heatley Warriors - Brendan Laakso |
| 1995 | Townsville Roosters | | Burdekin (Ayr) (3rd) | Burdekin (Ayr) 3 defeated Brothers 2 Burdekin (Ayr) - Steven Le Jarraga (2), Steven Stanbrook Brothers - Scott Rawkins, Mark Cooker |
| 1996 | | | Burdekin (Ayr) (4th) | Burdekin 3 defeated Herbert Valley 1 after extra time. It was 1-all at full time. Burdekin - Tim James, Tibor Hagymas (in extra time), Graham Ferguson (in extra time) Herbert Valley - Mark Andrejic Player of the grand final - Tim James (Burdekin) |
| 1997 | Brothers (1st) | | Wulguru Stuart Cluden (2nd) | Wulguru-Stuart-Cluden 1 defeated Brothers 0 Wulguru-Stuart-Cluden - Allen Paul |
| 1998 | Burdekin | | Aitkenvale Olympic (11th) | Aitkenvale Olympic 4 defeated Burdekin (Ayr) 3 with a golden goal in extra time. It was 3-all at full time. Aitkenvale Olympic - Brett Wilson, Own goal, Craig Windle, Duane Bosel (in extra time) Burdekin (Ayr) - Shane Boyce (2 including a penalty), Robert Iturbe Player of the match - Duane Bosel (Aitkenvale Olympic) |
| 1999 | Brothers (2nd) | 8 - Brothers, Burdekin (Ayr), Roosters, Warriors, Olympic, Thuringowa Rebels, Eagles Souths, Herbert Valley (Ingham) | Brothers (2nd) | Brothers 2 defeated Townsville Roosters 1 Brothers - Ben Brown, Paul Johnson Townsville Roosters - Ben Southwell |
| 2000 | Brothers (3rd) | | Aitkenvale Olympic (12th) | Aitkenvale Olympic 4 defeated Brothers 1 Aitkenvale Olympic - Mark Stewart (2), Steve Hilton, Che Pritchard Brothers - Mark Heath Player of the grand final - Mark Stewart (Aitkenvale Olympic) |
| 2001 | Brothers (Undefeated) (4th) | | Wulguru-Stuart-Cluden (3rd) | Wulguru-Stuart-Cluden 2 defeated Brothers 0 Wulguru Stuart Cluden - Shane Dove, Mark Grice Player of the match - Mark Grice (Wulguru Stuart Cluden) |
| 2002 | Brothers (5th) | 9 - Brothers, Wulguru-Stuart-Cluden, Aitkenvale Olympic United, Burdekin (Ayr), QLD Academy of Sport (North QLD), James Cook University, Eagles United, Heatley Warriors, Rebels | Brothers (3rd) | Brothers 3 defeated Aitkenvale Olympic United 1 Brothers - Reuben Thaiday (2), Kyle Mifsud Aitkenvale Olympic United - Theo Nicopolous |
| 2003 | Wulguru Stuart Cluden | | Aitkenvale Olympic (13th) | Aitkenvale Olympic defeated Wulguru Stuart Cluden 4–3 on penalties after extra time. It was 1-all at full time and after extra time. Aitkenvale Olympic - Theo Nicopoulos Wulguru Stuart Cluden - Mark Grice |
| 2004 | Wulguru Stuart Cluden | 9 - Wulguru-Stuart-Cluden, MA Olympic, Burdekin, James Cook University, Brothers, Heatley Warriors, Eagles Souths, Herbert Valley, QLD Academy of Sport | MA Olympic (14th) | MA Olympic 1 defeated Burdekin 0 MA Olympic - Nathan Whitton |
| 2005 | MA Olympic | 10 - MA Olympic, Wulguru Stuart Cluden, Burdekin (Ayr), Brothers, Herbert Valley (Ingham), Saints Eagles Souths, Heatley Warriors, James Cook University, Idalia Rovers, Rebels | Wulguru-Stuart-Cluden (4th) | Wulguru-Stuart-Cluden defeated Burdekin 4-2 on penalties after extra time. It was 0-0 at full time.and after extra time. |
| 2006 | Wulguru Stuart Cluden | 10 | MA Olympic (15th) | MA Olympic 1 defeated Wulguru United 0 MA Olympic - Nathan Whitton |
| 2007 | Wulguru Stuart Cluden | 10 | Brothers (4th) | Brothers 2 defeated Rebels 1 |
| 2008 | Rebels (1st) | 9 - Rebels, MA Olympic, Brothers, Wulguru-Stuart-Cluden, James Cook University, Saints Eagles Souths, Burdekin, Heatley Warriors, Ingham | MA Olympic (16th) | MA Olympic 1 defeated Rebels 0 MA Olympic - Nathan Whitton Player of the match - Craig Pendreigh (MA Olympic) |
| 2009 | MA Olympic | 10 | MA Olympic (17th) | MA Olympic 2 defeated Townsville Warriors 1 MA Olympic - Aiden Balle, Michael Brooks Warriors - Tyson Balanzategui |
| 2010 | Brothers (6th) | 10 - Brothers, MA Olympic, Saints Eagles Souths, Rebels, Burdekin, James Cook University, Herbert Valley, QLD Academy of Sport, Heatley Warriors, Wulguru-Stuart-Cluden | Brothers (5th) | Brothers 3 defeated MA Olympic 1 Brothers - Paul Sapelli, John O'Bagley, Alex Bennett MA Olympic - Dylan Rankin (penalty) |
| 2011 | MA Olympic | 10 | Saints Eagles Souths (1st) | Saints Eagles Souths 3 defeated MA Olympic 2 Saints Eagles Souths - Alex King, Matt Crowley, Campbell Hume MA Olympic - Kane Kefoed, Reece Edmonds |
| 2012 | Rebels (2nd) | 10 - | MA Olympic (18th) | MA Olympic 2 defeated Rebels 0 MA Olympic - Theo Nicopoulos, Dylan Rankin |
| 2013 | MA Olympic | 9 | Burdekin (Ayr) (5th) | Burdekin (Ayr) 1 defeated MA Olympic 0 Burdekin - Ryan Mottin |
| 2014 | Townsville Warriors (2nd) | 10 | Brothers (6th) | Brothers 2 defeated Townsville Warriors 1 |
| 2015 | MA Olympic | 8 - MA Olympic, Townsville Warriors, Rebels, Burdekin, Saints Souths Eagles, Wulguru United, Brothers, Ross River | Townsville Warriors (1st) | Townsville Warriors 2 defeated MA Olympic 1 Townsville Warriors - Stephen Ramsbotham, Ben Horrocks MA Olympic - Kimon Toumazos |
| 2016 | MA Olympic | 8 - MA Olympic, Brothers, Townsville Warriors, Rebels, Saints Eagles Souths, Burdekin (Ayr), Wulguru, Ingham | Rebels (1st) | Rebels 3 defeated MA Olympic 2 Rebels - Chris Clauss (penalty), Nic Figg, Kristian Vecchio MA Olympic - Theo Nicopoulos, Robin Edwards |
| 2017 | Brothers (7th) | 6 - Brothers, Burdekin (Ayr), MA Olympic, Rebels, Saints Eagles Souths, Townsville Warriors | Brothers (7th) | Brothers defeated MA Olympic 3–1 on penalties. It was 1-all at full time and after extra time. Brothers - Anthony Roulston MA Olympic - Unknown |
| 2018 | Townsville Warriors (3rd) | 8 - Townsville Warriors, Rebels, Wulguru United, MA Olympic, Saints Eagles Souths, Brothers, Burdekin (Ayr), Ingham | MA Olympic (19th) | MA Olympic 3 defeated Townsville Warriors 1 MA Olympic - Scott Dymock (2), Kai Mittereger Townsville Warriors - Jahya Hilton-McKeown |
| 2019 | MA Olympic | 8 - MA Olympic, Townsville Warriors, Brothers, Wulguru United, Saints Eagles Souths, Burdekin (Ayr), Rebels, Ingham | MA Olympic (20th) | MA Olympic 3 defeated Townsville Warriors 0 |
| 2020 | Saints Eagles Souths | 8 - Saints Eagles Souths, MA Olympic, Brothers, Townsville Warriors, Burdekin, Wulguru United, Rebels, Ingham | Saints Eagles Souths (2nd) | Saints Eagles Souths 4 defeated MA Olympic 2 after extra time. It was 1-all at full time. Saints Eagles Souths - Unknown (2), Campbell Hume (2 in extra time) MA Olympic - Unknown (2 including 1 in extra time) |
| 2021 | MA Olympic | 8 - MA Olympic, Brothers, Saints Eagles Souths, Burdekin, Townsville Warriors, Rebels, Estates, Ingham | MA Olympic (21st) | MA Olympic 3 defeated Brothers 1 |
| 2022 | MA Olympic | 9 - Brothers, Burdekin (Ayr), Estates, Ingham, MA Olympic, Rebels, Riverway JCU (James Cook University), Saints Eagles Souths, Townsville Warriors | MA Olympic (22nd) | MA Olympic 2 defeated Saints Eagles Souths 1 |
| 2023 | Brothers (8th) | 9 - Brothers, Burdekin, Estates, Ingham, MA Olympic, Rebels, Riverway JCU (James Cook University), Saints Eagles Souths, Townsville Warriors | Brothers (8th) | Brothers 1 defeated MA Olympic 0 |
| 2024 | MA Olympic | 8 - Brothers, Burdekin, Estates, MA Olympic, Rebels, Riverway JCU (James Cook University), Saints Eagles Souths, Townsville Warriors | Brothers (9th) | Brothers 4 defeated Burdekin 3 Brothers - Francis Witt (3), Enzo Barales Burdekin - Matthew Kolb (2), Luke Maguire |
| 2025 | MA Olympic | 8 - Brothers, Burdekin, Estates, MA Olympic, Rebels, Riverway JCU (James Cook University), Saints Eagles Souths, Townsville Warriors | MA Olympic (23rd) | MA Olympic 3 defeated Estates 2 MA Olympic - Padraic Glasheen (2 including a penalty), Tom Berzinski Estates - Sadiki Mwinyi (2) |
| 2026 | Brothers (9th) | 8 - Brothers, MA Olympic, Burdekin, Riverway JCU (James Cook University), Townsville Warriors, Estates, Saints Eagles Souths, Rebels | Brothers (10th) | Brothers 3 defeated Burdekin 1 at Paradise Park, Townsville Brothers - Liam Phelps, Joshua Evans, Jeremy Brockie Burdekin - Antoine Moncoudiol |

== Women's Premiers and Knock Out Cup/Champions (Grand Final Winners) ==
Women's Premiers and Knock Out Cup/Champions (Grand Final Winners)
| Season | Premiers | Number of Clubs | Knock Out Cup Winners | To be used for Notes/Scorers in the Knock Out Cup Final/Grand Final |
|---|---|---|---|---|
| 1979 | | 8 clubs from Townsville, Ingham, Ayr and Palm Island | RIPS-University | RIPS-University defeated Ayr 2-0 on penalties. It was 1-all at full time and after extra time. RIPS-University - Delilah Domic Ayr - Sue Brandon or Cathy Elton |
| 1981 | | | Ayr | Ayr 2 defeated Teachers-Uni 1 Goalscorers - Unknown |
| 1982 | | | Warriors (1st) | Grand Final - Herbert Valley 2 drew with Warriors 2 after full time Herbert Valley - Carmel Gatto, Natalie Vettoretto (penalty) Warriors - Tina Robert, Monica Weightman Grand Final Replay - Warriors 1 defeated Herbert Valley 0 |
| 1984 | | | Herbert Valley (Ingham) | Herbert Valley 2 defeated PYC (Police Youth Club) 1 Herbert Valley (Ingham) - Kim Shapcott, Chris Kinlay (penalty) PYC (Police Youth Club) - Karen Thompson |
| 1985 | Herbert Valley (Ingham) | Herbert Valley (Ingham), Idalia Rovers, Ayr, Warriors | Idalia Rovers | Idalia Rovers 2 defeated Herbert Valley (Ingham) 1 |
| 1987 | Souths Wallaroos | 6 - (tbc) Souths Wallaroos, Mundingburra Olympic United, Heatley Internationals, Ayr, Idalia Rovers, Wulguru-Stuart-Cluden | tbc | tbc |
| 1988 | Souths Wallaroos | 5 - Souths Wallaroos, Mundingburra Olympic United, Wulguru-Stuart-Cluden, Polonia, Burdekin (Ayr) | Souths Wallaroos | Souths Wallaroos 1 defeated Mundingburra Olympic United 0 Souths Wallaroos - Lyucica Tankosic |
| 1989 | Souths Wallaroos | tbc | tbc | tbc |
| 1990 | Souths Wallaroos | tbc | tbc | tbc |
| 1991 | Souths Wallaroos | 8 - Souths Wallaroos, Aitkenvale United, Mundingburra Olympic United, Heatley Warriors, Estates, Wulguru-Stuart-Cluden, Brothers, Polonia | Mundingburra Olympic United | Mundingburra Olympic United 1 defeated Souths Wallaroos 0 Mundingburra Olympic United - Sharon Stockwell (penalty) |
| 1992 | Souths Wallaroos | tbc | Estates | Grand Final - Estates 0 drew with Souths Wallaroos 0 after extra time Grand Final Replay - Estates 2 defeated Souths Wallaroos 0 Estates - Shae Fooks, Amber Overton |
| 1993 | Souths Wallaroos | 6 - Souths Wallaroos, Mundingburra Olympic United, Wulguru-Stuart-Cluden, Aitkenvale United, Brothers, Heatley Warriors | tbc | tbc |
| 1994 | Mundingburra Olympic United | 8 - Mundingburra Olympic United, Aitkenvale United, Wulguru-Stuart-Cluden, Souths Wallaroos, Heatley Warriors, Brothers, Burdekin (Ayr), Idalia Rovers | Aitkenvale United | Grand Final - Mundingburra Olympic United 0 drew with Aitkenvale United 0 after extra -time Grand Final Replay - Aitkenvale United 2 defeated Mundingburra Olympic United 1 Goalscorers - Unknown |
| 1995 | | 6 - Aitkenvale United, Brothers, Burdekin (Ayr), Heatley Warriors, Mundingburra Olympic United, Wulguru-Stuart-Cluden | | |
| 1996 | Mundingburra Aitkenvale Olympic United (Undefeated) | | Mundingburra Aitkenvale Olympic United | Mundingburra Aitkenvale Olympic United 2 defeated Herbert Valley 0 Goalscorers - Unknown Player of the finals series - Nicole Craperi (Herbert Valley) |
| 1999 | | | | Player of the match - Marissa Nicopoulos (Mundingburra Olympic United) |
| 2000 | Wulguru-Stuart-Cluden | | Mundingburra Olympic United | Mundingburra Olympic United 2 defeated Wulguru-Stuart-Cluden 1 Mundingburra Olympic United - Leah Barlow, Azra Parker Wulguru-Stuart-Cluden - Eleanor Robinson Player of the match - Marissa Nicopoulos (Mundingburra Olympic United) |
| 2002 | Wulguru-Stuart-Cluden (Undefeated) | | Burdekin (Ayr) | Burdekin 1 defeated Wulguru-Stuart-Cluden 0 Burdekin - Kristi Harch |
| 2008 | | | | |
| 2010 | | | North QLD Under 19's | North QLD Under 19's 2 defeated Burdekin 0 Goalscorers - Unknown |
| 2011 | | | Burdekin | |
| 2012 | | | Burdekin | Burdekin 3 defeated MA Olympic 0 |
| 2013 | Wulguru-Stuart-Cluden | | Burdekin | Burdekin 3 defeated Wulguru-Stuart-Cluden 1 Burdekin - Michelle Hodder, Catherine Roncato, Emily Said Wulguru-Stuart-Cluden - Alyce Quod |
| 2014 | | | Brothers (1st) | |
| 2015 | Brothers (1st) | | | |
| 2016 | MA Olympic | 7 - MA Olympic, Ingham, Rebels, Burdekin (Ayr), Brothers, Wulguru United, Townsville Warriors | MA Olympic | |
| 2017 | MA Olympic | 8 - MA Olympic, Brothers, Burdekin, Ingham, Wulguru United, Northern Fury, Saints Eagles Souths, Rebels | Burdekin | Burdekin 3 defeated Ingham 0 Goalscorers - Unknown |
| 2018 | Brothers | 6 - Brothers, Townsville Warriors, MA Olympic, Saints Eagles Souths, Burdekin, Estates | Brothers | Brothers 3 defeated Rebels 1 |
| 2020 | Brothers tbc | | MA Olympic | MA Olympic 1 defeated Brothers 0 MA Olympic - Emma Lovelady |
| 2021 | Brothers | 6 - Brothers, Townsville Warriors, MA Olympic, Saints Eagles Souths, Burdekin (Ayr), Estates | MA Olympic | MA Olympic 2 defeated Brothers 1 MA Olympic - Page Malau-Aduli, Monika Anderson Brothers - Brianna Clancy |
| 2022 | MA Olympic | | MA Olympic | MA Olympic 3 defeated Townsville Warriors 1 |
| 2023 | MA Olympic | 6 - MA Olympic, Brothers, Townsville Warriors, Riverway James Cook University, Rebels, Wulguru United | MA Olympic | MA Olympic defeated Brothers 4-3 on penalties after extra time. It was 0-all at full time. |
| 2024 | MA Olympic | 7 - MA Olympic, Brothers, Estates, Townsville Warriors, Riverway James Cook University, Burdekin (Ayr), Saints Eagles Souths | Brothers | Brothers 3 defeated MA Olympic 2 Brothers - Stephanie Luyt (2), Unknown MA Olympic - Tahlia Hedley, Monika Anderson |
| 2025 | MA Olympic | 5 - MA Olympic, Brothers, Riverway JCU (James Cook University), Townsville Warriors, Estates | Brothers | Brothers 2 defeated MA Olympic 0 Brothers - Jennifer Gulson, Lara Burgers |
| 2026 | MA Olympic (Undefeated) | 5 - MA Olympic, Townsville Warriors, Brothers, Saints Eagles Souths, Riverway JCU (James Cook University) | Townsville Warriors (2nd) | Townsville Warriors 2 defeated MA Olympic 1 at Paradise Park, Townsville Townsville Warriors - Sophie Hannay, Simone House MA Olympic - Elise Papageorge |

== North Queensland Premier League ==
The North Queensland Premier League is contested by the teams following:

North Queensland Premier League
| Team | Football Offered | Home Ground | Location | Est. |
|---|---|---|---|---|
| Brothers Townsville FC | Junior/Senior | Hi Vista Park | Townsville | 1967 |
| Burdekin FC | Junior/Senior | International Park | Ayr | 1973 as Ayr Senior Soccer Association |
| Estates FC | Junior/Senior | Victoria Park | Townsville | 1932 |
| Ingham Wolves FC | Junior/Senior | Augie Pane Fields | Ingham | 2007 |
| MA Olympic FC | Junior/Senior | Olympic Park | Townsville | 1959 as Internationals |
| Rebels FC | Junior/Senior | Greenwood Park | Townsville | 1973 |
| Riverway JCU FC | Junior/Senior | Joe Baker Field | Townsville | 2021 |
| Saints Eagles Souths FC | Junior/Senior | Aitkenvale Park | Townsville | 1971 |
| Townsville Warriors FC | Junior/Senior | Melrose Park | Townsville | 1966 |

The 2020 Premiers Plate was won by Saints Eagles Souths, where they also went and won the grand final 4–2 over Mundingburra Aitkenvale Olympic. In 2021, MA Olympic won the grand final 3–1 over Brothers Townsville FC.

Other clubs from the region that do not participate in the NQ Premier League include Wulguru United, NQ Congo United and Northern Beaches FC.

In August 2021, it was announced that the NQ Premier League would transition to FQPL North.

== Clubs ==
- Brothers Townsville - https://www.brotherstownsvillefc.com/
- Burdekin - https://www.burdekinfc.com/
- Estates Football Club - https://estatesfootballclub.com.au/
- MA Olympic - https://www.maolympic.org.au/
- Saints Eagles Souths - https://sesfc.com/
- Townsville Warriors - https://www.townsvillewarriorsfc.com.au/
