= Football Queensland Darling Downs =

Australian football administrative zone

- Formation: 1912; 114 years ago
- Headquarters: Toowoomba, Queensland
- Location: Australia
- Zone manager: Janelle Sothmann
- Main organ: Football Australia; Football Queensland
- Website: Official website

Football Queensland Darling Downs is a Football Queensland administrative zone encompassing the Darling Downs region and parts of South West Queensland. The zone administers major regional areas including Toowoomba, Dalby, Roma, Charleville, St George, Goondiwindi and Stanthorpe. The premier men's soccer competition is the Football Queensland Premier League 3 − Darling Downs and the premier women's soccer competition is the Football Queensland Women's Premier League 3 − Darling Downs. Football Queensland Darling Downs also has a numerous variety of lower divisions for both men and women, as well as academy and junior competitions to develop soccer and fitness within the region.

The administrative zone traces its history to the Toowoomba British Football Association formed early in the 20th century with games played as early as 1906. The earliest mention of a regional association zone was in 1912 when the secretary of the association sought permission to erect post and mark out a field within Albert Park. The region has since been represented by of a variety of administrative councils representing sections of the contemporary zone. In 2021 as part of Football Queensland Future of Football 2020+ reforms, the region's councils were collated and renamed Football Queensland Darling Downs.

== Governance ==
The earliest reference to a governing body is to the Toowoomba British Football Association in 1912. Presumably this association was affiliated with the Queensland governing body. In 2021 Football Queensland Darling Downs was created as an office and under the control of Football Queensland. Before 2021 local administration and decision-making was decentralised to regional associations including Football Toowoomba, Football Chinchilla, Football Stanthorpe and the South Burnett Soccer Federation.

== Football Toowoomba ==
The first game of British Association football was played in 1906, and the first club was Newtown. The same article suggests that by 1908 there were up to 5 teams in existence. During 1906, Newtown played a series of games under British Association rules at the Polo Grounds. Opponents included Rangers Rugby Football Club (rugby union) and the Young Rangers (rugby union). The game against Rangers Rugby Union team ended in a draw.

In 1906, the newly-formed Newtown club invited Brisbane club Milton to Toowoomba. Milton "won somewhat easily" but in the return game in Brisbane Newtown won 4 – 2.

In 1907, the newly-formed City or Cities teams played Newtown at the Polo Grounds.

By 1909, there were 5 clubs and a 6-team competition – Newtown Hotspurs, Toowoomba City, Western Suburbs, Kleinton Rovers, Kleinton Rangers and Oakey.

An early reference to British Association Football was in March 1912, when Mr. Henry Smith, the Secretary of the Toowooomba British Football Association approached the Gowrie Shire Council seeking permission to erect posts and mark out a field within Albert Park. The annual meeting of the Toowoomba British Football Association was also advertised in March 1912.

In June 1920, a Toowoomba representative side played the touring New South Wales side at the Athletic Grounds, Toowoomba. The local side put in a "creditable performance" losing 2 – 0.

In August 1920, a game was played at the Athletic Grounds, Toowoomba between a Toowoomba representative side and sailors from HMS Renown. At the time, there were 4 teams in the Toowoomba competition – Diggers, Norths, Western Suburbs and Wanderers (from Cawdor). Two Digger's players selected for this game played for Queensland. Percy Martin had represented Queensland before World War One, while Dugald French was a current Queensland squad member.

A preview of the 1924 season indicated that definitely 4 and up to 6 clubs would participate in senior football. The confirmed clubs were Diggers, Caledonians, Rangers and Toowoomba Athletic, with Waratahs and Willowburn Asylum also contemplating senior football. Toowoomba Athletic and Waratahs were junior clubs stepping up to senior level. Toowoomba Athletic played junior football as Scouts and it's possible they had some connection to the scouting movement. Junior football was in existence and 2 clubs mentioned were Starlights and Tech Old Boys. In addition, 7 schools were playing football.

In June 1925, the touring English FA side defeated a Toowoomba representative side 6 − 0 at the Toowoomba showgrounds in front of a crowd of 4,000. In July 1925, after the English FA tour soccer was introduced to Warwick.

By 1938 there were 9 teams – Willowburn, Gowrie-Little Plains, Gomoran, Oakey, Sugarloaf, Southern Cross, Greenwood, Kingsthorpe and Rovers.

In September 1938 the touring Indian national team defeated Queensland 5–2 at Athletic Oval (now Clive Berghofer Stadium/Toowoomba Sports Ground) in Toowoomba.

In July 1939, Palestine defeated a "weak" Queensland team 13–3 in Toowoomba.

=== After World War II ===
Toowoomba Soccer Federation - 1949 Final Table
Position	Club	Played	Won	Drew	Lost	For	Against	Points
Premiers	Valley	12	7	2	3	36	24	16
2nd	Cawdor Rangers	12	6	2	4	44	24	14
3rd	Blue Stars	12	6	2	4	37	32	14
4th	Willowburn	12	2	0	10	20	57	4
	Totals	48	21	6	21	137	137	48

Football in the Toowoomba region went into remission during World War 2. It re-commenced in 1946 with the re-formation of the Acland & District Soccer Association which included a Toowoomba club as one of its 6 affiliated clubs.

The Toowoomba Soccer Association was re-formed in 1949 and had 4 affiliated senior clubs; Blue Stars, Cawdor Rangers, Valley and Willowburn. In 1949 Valley won the first post World War premiership and Willowburn won the Knock-Out Cup defeating Valley 2 - 0 in the final.

In 1975 the Men's representative team of the Toowoomba & District Soccer Federation was given direct entry into the 1976 Ampol Cup. The Ampol Cup became a State-wide competition having previously being limited to First Division clubs from Brisbane and Ipswich.

In May 2024 Willowburn celebrated the 75th anniversary of their formation (in 1949) with a gala dinner.

=== Women's Football ===
Toowoomba was a pioneer of Women's football in Queensland and Australia. In June 1921 at about the same time that Women's football was commencing in Brisbane, clubs were also being formed in Toowoomba. The first clubs were Toowoomba Rovers and Toowoomba Cities.

In July 1921, interest was growing in sending a Toowoomba ladies representative team to play in Brisbane, with the Toowoomba players training at the Showgrounds.

A number of female footballers from Toowoomba have played for the Matildas, including Lana Harch and Karla Reuter.

=== Winstanley Memorial Shield (Men) ===
The Winstanley Memorial Shield is a senior Men's pre-season competition held in memory of Ian David (Dickie) Winstanley, a talented Toowoomba footballer who died on 16 July 1961, aged 18, from injuries suffered in a car accident. Winstanley played seniors at age 16, captained the Toowoomba Under 18 representative side and at age 18 captained the Toowoomba Under 21 representative side. In 1960, Winstanley won Willowburn's best and fairest player award (the Stanley Prasser Memorial Trophy).

==== Winstanley Memorial Shield winners ====
- 1962 – Willowburn (1st)
- 1963 – Willowburn (2nd) - defeated Tatersalls Rovers 4-3
- 1964 – Tattersalls Rovers (1st)
- 1965 – Willowburn (3rd) - defeated Rangers 4-2
- 1966 – Willowburn (4th) - Willowburn (A) 4 defeated Rangers (A) 1
- 1967 – Willowburn (5th)
- 1968 – Willowburn (6th)
- 1969 – Willowburn (7th) – defeated Rockville Rovers 1–0
- 1970 – Queensland Agricultural College A (1st)
- 1971 – Rockville Rovers (1st)
- 1972 – Willowburn (8th) – defeated St Albans (the score is unknown)
- 1973 – Rockville Rovers (2nd) – defeated Rangers 2–1
- 1974 – Rockville Rovers (3rd) – defeated Aviation 2–1
- 1975 – Rangers (1st) - defeated Aviation 6-1
- 1976 – Rangers (2nd)
- 1977 – Willowburn (9th)
- 1978 – Wanderers (1st)
- 1979 – Rangers (3rd)
- 1980 – Wanderers (2nd)
- 1981 – Wanderers (3rd)
- 1982 – Wanderers (4th)
- 1983 – Wanderers (5th)
- 1984 – St Albans (1st)
- 1985 – Wanderers (6th) - defeated St Albans 2-0
- 1986 – DDIAE (1st)
- 1987 – St Albans (2nd)
- 1988 – Willowburn (10th) – defeated Wanderers 3–2
- 1989 – Wanderers (7th)
- 1990 – Wanderers (8th)
- 1991 – Rockville Rovers (4th)
- 1992 – Willowburn (11th)
- 1993 – Dalby (1st)
- 1994 – Not contested
- 1995 – Not contested
- 1996 – Not contested
- 1997 – USQ (2nd)
- 1998 – USQ (3rd)
- 1999 – Not contested
- 2000 – Not contested
- 2001 – Not contested
- 2002 – Not contested
- 2003 – Not contested
- 2004 – Not contested
- 2005 – Not contested
- 2006 – South Toowoomba (1st)
- 2007 – West Wanderers (9th)
- 2008 – Not contested
- 2009 – South Toowoomba (2nd)
- 2010 – Not contested
- 2011 – Willowburn (12th)
- 2012 – Willowburn (13th) – defeated USQ 5–1
- 2013 – South Toowoomba (3rd)
- 2014 – Willowburn (White) (14th) – defeated Willowburn (Black) 7–0
- 2015 – Gatton (1st) – defeated Willowburn 5–4 after extra time. It was 4-all at full time.
- 2016 – West Wanderers (10th) & Willowburn (15th) (Joint winners)
- 2017 – Willowburn (16th)
- 2018 – Willowburn (17th) – defeated Rockville Rovers 2–1
- 2019 – Rockville Rovers (5th) – defeated Willowburn 2–1
- 2020 – Gatton (2nd) – defeated USQ 4–1 on penalties after it was 2-all after extra time.
- 2021 – Rockville Rovers (6th)
- 2022 – Gatton (3rd)
- 2023 – Willowburn (18th)
- 2024 - Gatton (4th)
- 2025 - Gatton (5th)

=== Tom McVeigh Trophy (Women) ===
==== Tom McVeigh Trophy winners ====
Year	Winners	Opposition	Score	Goalscorers
1981	St Albans			
1982	Willowburn			
1983	Wanderers			
1984	Willowburn			
1985	Willowburn	St Albans	4–1	Willowburn – Michelle Schneider, Chris Wollf, Robyn Fellowes, Own goal St Albans – Ros Nugent
1988	St Albans	DDIAE	2–0	St Albans – Ann-Louise Edwards, Pat Fraser
1989	Willowburn	Example	Example	Example
1990	Willowburn	Example	Example	Example
1991	St Albans			
2007	West Wanderers			
2012	Gatton	Willowburn	4–1	
2013	Gatton			
2014	Highfields	Willowburn	3–1	
2015	Rockville Rovers	Highfields	3–1	
2016	Willowburn	Rockville Rovers	3-0	
2017	Unknown	Highfields played Rockville Rovers in the final		
2018	Willowburn	Rockville Rovers	8–2	Willowburn – Rockville Rovers – Penny Dukes, Samantha Stubbs
2019	Willowburn	Highfields	Won 3-0 on penalties after it was 3-3 after extra time	
2020	Rockville Rovers	USQ	4–0	Rockville Rovers – Sarah Sheridan (3), Miranda Griffiths
2021	Willowburn	USQ	4–1	Willowburn – Courtney Morris (2), Sophie Fuller, Nina Grant USQ – Unknown (penalty)
2022	Willowburn	Highfield	4-1	
2023	Willowburn	Rockville Rovers	7-1	
2024	Willowburn	Highfields		
2025	Willowburn			

==== Clubs and competitions ====
The Premier competitions in the region are the NPL Queensland Men's, NPL Queensland Women's, FQPL 3 Darling Downs Men's and FQPL 3 Darling Downs Women's, all of which form part of the Central Conference in the Football Queensland pyramid.

Club	Home Ground	Location	Established
Chinchilla Bears	Chinchilla Showgrounds	Chinchilla	Mid-1970's
Garden City Raiders	Middle Ridge Park		
Gatton Redbacks	Redback Park	Gatton	1991
Highfields FC	Highfields Sport and Recreation Park	Highfields	1999
Kingaroy FC			
Oakey Soccer Club	Federal Sporting Grounds	Oakey	As a junior club in July 1978
Pittsworth Vikings	Pittsworth Soccer Club	Pittsworth	1979
Rockville Rovers	Captain Cook Recreation Reserve	Rockville, Toowoomba	1969
St Albans	Middle Ridge Park	Middle Ridge, Toowoomba	1961
South Toowoomba Hawks	Harristown Park	Harristown, Toowoomba	1995
Stanthorpe Carlton United	CF White Oval	Stanthorpe	
Stanthorpe International	International Club Oval	Stanthorpe	
Stanthorpe United Redbacks	CF White Oval	Stanthorpe	
SWQ Thunder	Clive Berghofer Stadium	Toowoomba	
TAS United	Toowoomba Anglican School	Toowoomba	
Toowoomba Grammar School FC	Toowoomba Grammar School	Toowoomba	
USQ FC	Toara Park	Toowoomba	1977 (as the Darling Downs Institute of Advanced Education Soccer Club)
Warwick Wolves	Queens Park	Warwick	
West Wanderers FC	Nell E Robinson Park	Toowoomba	In February 1953 as Wanderers (a seniors club), 2010 renamed West Wanderers
Willowburn FC	Commonwealth Oval	Toowoomba	1949
Withcott FC	Withcott Sports Complex	Parkridge Drive, Withcott	

==== Former clubs ====
- Balgowan

==== Toowoomba Senior Premiers and Grand Final winners ====
Season	Ladies Premiers	Ladies Grand Final Winners	Men's Premiers	Knock-Out Cup Winners
1949			Valleys	Willowburn
Season	Ladies Premiers	Ladies Grand Final Winners	Men's Premiers	John Harding Memorial Knock-Out Cup Winners
1950			Acland Rovers	Valleys
1951			Acland Rovers	Acland Rovers
1952			Acland Rovers	Cawdor Rangers
1953			Acland	Wanderers (1st)
1954			Wanderers (1st)	Acland 4 defeated Wanderers 2 at Willowburn Oval
1955			Acland	Acland
1956			Wanderers (Undefeated) (2nd)	Wanderers (2nd) 7 defeated Blue Stars 1
1957			Blue Stars	Blues Stars 3 defeated Rangers 2
1958			Wanderers (3rd)	Blue Stars defeated Wanderers
1959			Willowburn (1st)	Wanderers (3rd) Wanderers 4 defeated Willowburn 2 at Willowburn Oval
1960			Wanderers (4th)	Wanderers (4th)
1961			Willowburn (2nd)	Wanderers (5th) 3 defeated Willowburn 2
1962			Wanderers (5th)	Rangers (A) 3 defeated Wanderers 2
1963			Willowburn (A) (3rd)	Game 1 - Rangers (A) 5 drew with Tattersalls Rovers (A) 5 Replay - Rangers (A) 4 defeated Tattersalls Rovers (A) 2
1964			Tattersalls Rovers or Rangers (Tbc)	Tattersalls Rovers
1965			Willowburn (A) (4th)	Rangers 2 defeated Willowburn 0
1966				
1967			Rangers	Queensland Agricultural College A
1968			Willowburn A	Queensland Agricultural College A
1969			Willowburn	Willowburn (James Harding Memorial Cup)
1970			Rockville Rovers A (1st)	Rockville Rovers A (James Harding Memorial Cup)
1971			Queensland Agricultural College (Gatton)	Rockville Rovers (James Harding Memorial Cup)
1972			Willowburn (Undefeated)	Willowburn Willowburn defeated Rangers 4–1 in a replay (the first Harding Cup final was drawn 5–5 after extra time)
1973			Rockville Rovers (2nd)	Willowburn 5 defeated Wanderers 2
1974			Willowburn	Rangers 2 defeated Aviation 0
Season	Ladies Premiers	Ladies Grand Final Winners	Men's Premiers	Grand Final Winners
1975			Rangers	Lockyer United 2 defeated Rangers 0
1976			Willowburn	Willowburn 4 defeated Rangers 3
1977			Willowburn	Wanderers 4 defeated Willowburn 1
1978			Wanderers	Grand Final – Wanderers 3 drew with Rangers 3 Grand Final Replay – Wanderers 1 defeated Rangers 0
1979	Toowoomba United	Toowoomba United defeated DDIAE (Score unknown)	Willowburn	Wanderers 2 defeated Willowburn 1
1980	Wanderers (1st)	Grand Final – DDIAE 0 drew with St Albans 0 Grand Final Replay – DDIAE 1 defeated St Albans 0	Wanderers (Undefeated)	Wanderers 2 defeated DDIAE 1
1981	St Albans (1st)	Grand Final – St Albans 0 drew with DDIAE 0 First Grand Final Replay – St Albans 0 drew with DDIAE 0 Second Grand Final Replay - St Albans 2 defeated DDIAE 1	Wanderers (Undefeated)	Wanderers 3 defeated DDIAE 0
1982	Willowburn (1st)	Willowburn 2 defeated St Albans 0 at Bridge Street, Toowoomba	Wanderers (Undefeated)	Wanderers 2 defeated St Albans 1
1983	St Albans 1 (2nd)	St Albans 2 defeated Willowburn 1	Wanderers (Undefeated)	Wanderers 4 defeated St Albans 0
1984	Willowburn (Undefeated) (2nd)	Wanderers 1 defeated Willowburn 0	Wanderers	Wanderers 2 defeated Willowburn 1
1985	Willowburn (Undefeated) (3rd)	Willowburn 3 defeated Rockville Rovers (Plaza) 0 at St Albans Football Club, Ruthven Street, Toowoomba	DDIAE (1st)	DDIAE (1st) Grand Final - DDIAE 0 drew with Wanderers 0 after extra time Grand Final Replay - DDIAE 2 defeated Wanderers 0 at St Albans Football Club, Ruthven Street, Toowoomba
1986	Willowburn (4th)	Willowburn 3 defeated St Albans 1	Wanderers	DDIAE (2nd) DDIAE 3 defeated Wanderers 0
1987	St Albans (Undefeated) (3rd)	Willowburn 3 defeated St Albans 0	Wanderers	Willowburn 3 defeated Wanderers 1
1988	St Albans (Undefeated) (4th)	Willowburn 2 defeated St Albans 1	Wanderers	Wanderers 1 defeated Willowburn 0
1989	St Albans (5th)	St Albans 3 defeated DDIAE 2 at Nell E Robinson Park, Toowoomba	Rockville Rovers (3rd)	Grand Final - Wanderers 0 drew with Rockville Rovers 0 at Nell E Robinson Park, Toowoomba Grand Final Replay - Wanderers defeated Rockville Rovers 4–3 on penalties after extra-time (0–0 after extra-time, 0–0 at full-time) at St Albans Football Club, Ruthven Street, Toowoomba
1990	St Albans (6th)	Willowburn 2 defeated St Albans 1	Dalby	Wanderers 1 defeated Dalby 0 (Replay)
1991	USQ (1st)	St Albans 2 defeated UCSQ 1 at St Albans Football Club, Ruthven Street, Toowoomba	Wanderers	Rockville Rovers 2 defeated Wanderers 0 at St Albans Football Club, Ruthven Street, Toowoomba
1992	St Albans (7th)	St Albans 1 defeated Willowburn 0	Rockville Rovers (4th)	Rockville Rovers defeated Stanthorpe International 5-3 on penalties after it was 0-all at fulltime and 1-all after extra time at Nell E Robinson Park, Toowoomba
1993	USQ (2nd)	USQ 3 defeated St Albans 2 at Bridge Street Oval, Toowoomba	Dalby	Wanderers 2 defeated Dalby 0 at Bridge Street Oval, Toowoomba
1994	USQ (3rd)	St Albans (Maroon) 2 defeated St Albans (Blue) 1 at Toowoomba Sportsground	Wanderers	Wanderers 1 defeated Dalby 0 after extra-time (0–0 at full time) at Toowoomba Sportsground
1995	Willowburn (5th)	St Albans 1 defeated Dalby 0	Wanderers	Wanderers 2 defeated USQ 0
1996	St Albans (Blue) (8th)	St Albans (Blue) 6 defeated Wanderers 0	USQ (2nd)	Wanderers 2 defeated Dalby 1
1997	Wanderers (2nd)	Wanderers 2 defeated St Albans (Blue) 0	Willowburn	Willowburn 2 defeated Wanderers 1 after extra-time (1–1 at full-time)
1998	The Glennie School (1st)	Wanderers 3 defeated St Albans 2	Wanderers	Willowburn 3 defeated USQ 0
1999	Dalby (1st)	St Albans 2 defeated Dalby 1 (with a golden goal in extra-time)	Willowburn	Wanderers 1 defeated St Albans 0
2000	Fairholme College (1st)		USQ	Willowburn (Score unknown)
2001	Fairholme College (2nd)	The Glennie School	USQ (Gold)	Rockville Rovers 3 defeated Willowburn 2
2002	Fairholme College (3rd)	Fairholme College 4 defeated St Albans 0	USQ (Gold)	Wanderers 2 defeated USQ (Gold) 1
2003	Gatton (1st)	Gatton 2 defeated Fairholme College 1	Willowburn	Raiders defeated Willowburn on penalties after extra time (1–1 at full-time, 1–1 after extra time)
2004			South Toowoomba	St Albans defeated South Toowoomba
2005	Rockville Rovers (Green) (Undefeated) (1st)	Rockville Rovers (Green) 3 defeated Gatton 2	South Toowoomba (Undefeated)	South Toowoomba 2 defeated USQ 1
2006		Gatton 1 defeated Rockville Rovers 0	South Toowoomba	South Toowoomba defeated Willowburn 4–2 on penalties after extra-time (2–2 after extra-time, 1–1 at full-time)
2007	Gatton	Glennie 2 defeated Gatton 1	West Wanderers	South Toowoomba South Toowoomba 3 defeated West Wanderers 2
2008	Gatton	Warwick defeated Glennie 3–0 on penalties, 0–0 after extra time and 0–0 at full-time	Willowburn	West Wanderers 3 defeated Willowburn 2
2009	Gatton	Gatton 3 defeated Rockville Rovers 2	South Toowoomba	South Toowoomba South Toowoomba 2 defeated West Wanderers 0
2010			South Toowoomba	South Toowoomba South Toowoomba 3 defeated Willowburn 0
2011		Rockville Rovers 6 defeated Gatton 2	South Toowoomba	South Toowoomba 2 defeated Willowburn 1
2012		Rockville Rovers 4 defeated Highfields 1 after extra time. It was 1-all at full time.	Willowburn	Willowburn Willowburn 3 defeated South Toowoomba 1
2013	Willowburn	Rockville Rovers 3 defeated Willowburn 1	Willowburn	USQ defeated Willowburn 5–4 on penalties (1–1 after extra-time, 1–1 at full-time)
2014	Rockville Rovers (2nd)	Willowburn 3 defeated Rockville 1 after extra time	Willowburn	Willowburn 4 defeated Gatton 0 at Nell E Robinson Park, Toowoomba
2015			St Albans (1st)	West Wanderers defeated Willowburn
2016	Willowburn (Undefeated)	Willowburn 3 defeated Warwick 0	West Wanderers (Undefeated)	West Wanderers 2 defeated Gatton 1
2017	Rockville Rovers (3rd)	Rockville Rovers 5 defeated Willowburn 2	Willowburn	Willowburn 2 defeated USQ 0
2018	Willowburn (Undefeated)	Willowburn 2 defeated Rockville Rovers 1	USQ	USQ 3 defeated Willowburn 1 on penalties after extra time. It was 3-all at full time and after extra time.
2019	Willowburn	Rockville Rovers 4 defeated Willowburn 3	USQ	Willowburn 3 defeated USQ 0
2020	Willowburn	Willowburn 3 defeated Highfields 1	Willowburn	Willowburn defeated Stanthorpe United 4–1 on penalties (2–2 after extra-time, 1–1 at full-time)
2021	Willowburn	Willowburn 4 defeated Highfields 2	St Albans (2nd)	St Albans 2 defeated Willowburn 1
2022	Willowburn	Highfields 2 defeated Willowburn 0	Willowburn (Undefeated)	Willowburn 3 defeated West Wanderers 2
2023	Willowburn (White)	Highfields (Gold) 4 defeated Willowburn (White) 1	Willowburn	Willowburn 2 defeated St Albans 1
2024	Highfields (Green) (1st)	Highfields (Green) 2 defeated Willowburn 0	Rockville Rovers (5th)	Gatton 4 defeated Rockville Rovers 1
2025	Willowburn (White) (Undefeated)	Willowburn (White) 3 defeated Highfields (Gold) 2 after extra time. It was 1-all at full time.	Willowburn	Willowburn 1 defeated West Wanderers 0 after extra time. It was 0-all at full time.
2026	Highfields (Gold) (Undefeated) (2nd)	Highfields (Gold) 2 defeated Willowburn (White) 0 at Toowoomba Sports Ground	St Albans (3rd)	Willowburn 4 defeated West Wanderers 1 at Toowoomba Sports Ground

== Football Stanthorpe ==
The first recorded game of football in the Stanthorpe region was played at Stanthorpe in 1894 between Dalveen and Amosfield. The game ended in a 2-all draw. There is also evidence of British Association football being played in Tenterfield as early as May 1921, when an Armidale team visited Tenterfield.

The Stanthorpe District Soccer Association (SDSA) was formed in 1926 with three clubs – Amiens, The Summit and Stanthorpe.

The touring Chinese national team was scheduled to play Stanthorpe in August 1927, on their way to Brisbane to play Brisbane and Queensland, however the game was abandoned when part of the Chinese team refused to continue the tour.

In August 1930, the New South Wales team defeated a Stanthorpe representative side 7–0 in Stanthorpe on their way to Brisbane to play Queensland.

The Ballandean club was formed and affiliated with the SDSA in 1935, winning the premiership and Bishop Cup in their first season.

In July 1951, a Stanthorpe representative side played a Toowoomba representative side at the Brisbane Cricket Ground as a curtain-raiser to the third test between Australia and England. Toowoomba defeated Stanthorpe 3–1.

In 1952, Stanthorpe regained the Perkins Cup from Toowoomba. The Perkins Cup was donated by Mr Perkins (of Toowoomba) for competition between Ipswich, Toowoomba, Warwick and Stanthorpe. At this time the SDSA had 5 affiliated clubs – Amiens, The Summit, Glen Aplin, Ballandean and Stanthorpe.

In October 2021, Stanthorpe International celebrated the 60th anniversary of its formation in 1961 by Italian farm workers with a re-union dinner.

=== Current clubs ===
Club	Home Ground	Year of Formation	Website/Facebook Page
Ballandean	Ballandean Football Club Grounds, Curr Road, Ballandean	1935	Ballandean Football Club Facebook Page
Stanthorpe Carlton United	CF White Oval, Stanthorpe	1974	Stanthorpe Carlton United Football Club Website
Stanthorpe City	CF White Oval, Stanthorpe	1982	Stanthorpe City Football Club Facebook Page
Stanthorpe International	The Stanthorpe International Club	1961	Stanthorpe International Football Club Website
Stanthorpe United	The Stanthorpe International Club	1994	Stanthorpe United Website
Tenterfield	Federation Park (Seniors), Shirley Park (Juniors)	Unknown	Tenterfield Soccer Club Facebook Page

=== Former clubs ===
- Allora
- Amiens
- Glen Aplin (re-named Souths mid-season 1971)
- Olympia
- Pozieres
- Severnlea
- Souths (until mid-season 1971 were known as Glen Aplin)
- Combines (The Summit)
- Thulimbah
- Wallangarra
- Warwick

=== Stanthorpe & District Senior Premiers and Grand Final Winners ===
Season	Women's Premiers	Women's Grand Final Winners	Men's Premiers	Men's Grand Final Winners
1928			Pozieres	Pozieres 6 defeated Stanthorpe 1
1930			Amiens	
1935			Ballandean (1st)	
1937			Ballandean (2nd)	
1938			Ballandean (3rd)	
1945			Pozieres	
1947			Pozieres	
1948			Amiens	
1949			Amiens	
1950			Amiens	
1951			The Summit	
1957			Combines (The Summit)	
1968				Stanthorpe International
1969				Stanthorpe International
1970				Stanthorpe International
1971			Stanthorpe International	Souths 2 defeated Stanthorpe International 1 after extra-time at CF White Oval, Stanthorpe. It was 1-all at full time.
1972			Stanthorpe International	Stanthorpe International 4 defeated Souths 0 at CF White Oval, Stanthorpe
1973			Stanthorpe International	Stanthorpe International 5 defeated Stanthorpe International Wolves 0 at CF White Oval, Stanthorpe
1974			Carlton United (1st)	Carlton United (1st) Carlton United 2 defeated Stanthorpe International 1 at CF White Oval, Stanthorpe
1975			Stanthorpe International	Stanthorpe International 1 defeated Stanthorpe Carlton United 0
1976			Carlton United (2nd)	Stanthorpe International 3 defeated Carlton United 1 at CF White Oval, Stanthorpe
1977			Ballandean (Undefeated)	Ballandean
1978			Ballandean	Carlton United (2nd) Carlton United 1 defeated Ballandean 0 at CF White Oval, Stanthorpe
1979			Carlton United (Undefeated) (4th)	Tenterfield 4 defeated Carlton United 2 at CF White Oval, Stanthorpe
1980			Norths	Stanthorpe International 1 defeated Norths 0
1981			Stanthorpe Carlton United (5th)	Stanthorpe Carlton United (3rd) Stanthorpe Carlton United 1 defeated Stanthorpe International 0
1982			Stanthorpe City (1st)	Stanthorpe City (1st) Stanthorpe City 5 defeated Stanthorpe International 0
1983			Stanthorpe City (2nd)	Stanthorpe Carlton United (4th) Grand Final – Stanthorpe Carlton United 3 drew with Stanthorpe City 3 after extra time Grand Final Replay – Stanthorpe Carlton United 3 defeated Stanthorpe City 2 after extra time
1984			Ballandean	Ballandean 1 defeated Carlton United 0 at CF White Oval, Stanthorpe
1985			Stanthorpe Carlton United	Stanthorpe Carlton United Stanthorpe Carlton United 5 defeated Stanthorpe City 1
1986			Stanthorpe International	Grand Final - Stanthorpe International 1 drew with Stanthorpe Carlton United 1 after extra time (1–1 at full-time) Grand Final Replay - Stanthorpe International 2 defeated Stanthorpe Carlton United 1 after extra time (1–1 at full-time)
1987			Stanthorpe International	Stanthorpe International 2 defeated Stanthorpe Carlton United 1 after extra time (1–1 at full-time)
1988			Stanthorpe International	Stanthorpe International 3 defeated Tenterfield 0
1989			Stanthorpe International	Stanthorpe International 2 defeated Ballandean 1
1990			Country Club	Grand Final - Country Club 0 drew with Stanthorpe Carlton United 0 after extra time Grand Final Replay - Country Club 4 defeated Carlton United 3 after extra time. It was 2-all at full-time.
1991			Top Pub (1st)	Top Pub 7 defeated Carlton United 0 at CF White Oval, Stanthorpe
1992			Top Pub (2nd)	Top Pub 1 defeated Ballandean 0 at CF White Oval, Stanthorpe
1993			Stanthorpe International	Stanthorpe International 3 defeated Stanthorpe City 1 at CF White Oval, Stanthorpe
1994			Ballandean	Ballandean 2 defeated Tenterfield 0 at CF White Oval, Stanthorpe
1995			Ballandean	Ballandean 2 defeated Stanthorpe City 1
1996			Ballandean	Ballandean 4 defeated Stanthorpe City 1
1997			Stanthorpe City (3rd)	Stanthorpe City 4 defeated Tenterfield 2
1998	Stanthorpe International (1st)	Tenterfield defeated Stanthorpe International 1–0 in a sudden death penalty shoot-out (0–0 at full-time, 0–0 after extra-time)	Stanthorpe City (4th)	Stanthorpe City 1 defeated Tenterfield 0
1999	Ballandean (1st)	Stanthorpe City 2 defeated Ballandean 0	Stanthorpe City (5th)	Stanthorpe City 2 defeated Ballandean 1 after extra-time; 1–1 at full-time
2000	Tenterfield (Undefeated) (1st)	Tenterfield defeated Ballandean 2–1 on penalties after extra-time (0–0 after extra time and at full-time)	Tenterfield	Tenterfield 2 defeated Ballandean 1
2001	Tenterfield (2nd)	Tenterfield 3 defeated Stanthorpe City 0	Stanthorpe City (6th)	Stanthorpe City 4 defeated Tenterfield 2
2002	Stanthorpe City (1st)	Stanthorpe City 2 defeated Ballandean 0	Ballandean	Stanthorpe City 4 defeated Stanthorpe United 2
2003	Tenterfield (Undefeated) (3rd)	Stanthorpe Carlton United 1 defeated Tenterfield 0	Stanthorpe City (7th)	Stanthorpe City 3 defeated Stanthorpe United 0
2004	Stanthorpe City (2nd)	Stanthorpe Carlton United 2 defeated Stanthorpe City 1 at CF White Oval, Stanthorpe	Stanthorpe City (8th)	Stanthorpe City 2 defeated Stanthorpe United 1 with a golden goal in extra-time at CF White Oval, Stanthorpe
2005	Ballandean (2nd)	Ballandean 1 defeated Stanthorpe City 0 with a golden goal in extra-time	Stanthorpe United (1st)	Stanthorpe Carlton United 1 defeated Stanthorpe United 0
2006	Stanthorpe City (3rd)	Ballandean 1 defeated Stanthorpe City 0 with a golden goal in extra-time at CF White Oval, Stanthorpe	Carlton United	Stanthorpe City 3 defeated Carlton United 2 with a golden goal in extra-time at CF White Oval, Stanthorpe. It was 2–all at full-time.
2007	Ballandean (3rd)	Ballandean	Stanthorpe United (2nd)	Stanthorpe United (1st)
2008	Ballandean (4th)	Ballandean 3 defeated Stanthorpe United 1	Stanthorpe United (3rd)	Stanthorpe United (2nd) Stanthorpe United 1 defeated Stanthorpe Carlton United 0
2009	Ballandean (Undefeated) (5th)	Stanthorpe United 1 defeated Ballandean 0 after extra-time, 0–0 at full time	Stanthorpe Carlton United	Stanthorpe United (3rd) Stanthorpe United 1 defeated Stanthorpe Carlton United 0
2010	Stanthorpe United (1st)	Stanthorpe United 2 defeated Tenterfield 0	Stanthorpe United (Undefeated) (4th)	Stanthorpe United (4th) Stanthorpe United 4 defeated Stanthorpe City 0
2011	Stanthorpe City (4th)	Stanthorpe City 3 defeated Stanthorpe United 1	Stanthorpe United (5th)	Stanthorpe United (5th) Stanthorpe United 2 defeated Stanthorpe Carlton United 0
2012	Stanthorpe United (Undefeated) (2nd)	Stanthorpe United defeated Ballandean 5–4 on penalties after it was 1–1 after extra-time, 0–0 at full-time	Stanthorpe United (6th)	Stanthorpe United (6th) Stanthorpe United 2 defeated Stanthorpe City 1
2013	Stanthorpe United (3rd)	Stanthorpe United 2 defeated Tenterfield 1	Stanthorpe United (7th)	Stanthorpe United (7th) Stanthorpe United 1 defeated Warwick 0
2014	Ballandean (6th)	Ballandean 3 defeated Tenterfield 2	Stanthorpe United (8th)	Stanthorpe United (8th) Stanthorpe United 1 defeated Ballandean 0
2015	Tenterfield (4th)	Tenterfield 1 defeated Ballandean 0	Warwick	Ballandean defeated Warwick 4–2 on penalties after it was 0–0 after extra time
2016	Ballandean (7th)	Ballandean 2 defeated Stanthorpe United 1 after extra-time	Ballandean	Ballandean 3 defeated Stanthorpe United 2
2017	Ballandean (8th)	Ballandean 1 defeated Tenterfield 0 after extra-time (0–0 at full-time)	Stanthorpe United (9th)	Stanthorpe United (9th) Stanthorpe United 3 defeated Ballandean 1
2018	Ballandean (9th)	Stanthorpe City 2 defeated Ballandean 1 after extra time, 1–1 at full time	Stanthorpe United (10th)	Stanthorpe United (10th) Stanthorpe United 2 defeated Ballandean 0
2019	Ballandean (Undefeated) (10th)	Ballandean 2 defeated Tenterfield 1 after extra time. It was 1-all at full time.	Stanthorpe City (9th)	Stanthorpe United (11th) Stanthorpe United 3 defeated Ballandean 2
2020				
2021	Ballandean (Undefeated) (11th)	Ballandean defeated Stanthorpe International	Stanthorpe Carlton United	Stanthorpe United (12th)
2022	Stanthorpe International	Stanthorpe International 3 defeated Ballandean 2	Stanthorpe Carlton United	Stanthorpe United 5 defeated Stanthorpe Carlton United 3
2023	Ballandean (12th)	Ballandean defeated Stanthorpe International 6-5 on penalties after extra time. It was 1-all at full time and after extra time	Stanthorpe Carlton United	Ballandean 1 defeated Stanthorpe Carlton United 0
2024	Ballandean (13th)	Stanthorpe United 3 defeated Stanthorpe International 0	Stanthorpe Carlton United (Undefeated)	Stanthorpe Carlton United 1 defeated Ballandean 0
2025	Stanthorpe City (5th)	Stanthorpe City 3 defeated Tenterfield 0	Stanthorpe Carlton United (Undefeated)	Stanthorpe Carlton United 2 defeated Stanthorpe City 1
2026	Stanthorpe City (6th)	Stanthorpe United 2 defeated Stanthorpe City 0 at International Club, Stanthorpe	Stanthorpe City (10th)	Carlton United 2 defeated Stanthorpe City 1 after extra time at International Club, Stanthorpe. It was 1-all at full time.

== Football South Burnett ==
Murmurings around creating the South Burnett Soccer Federation (SBSA) were growing in July 1928 with three clubs in existence (Kingaroy, Murgon and Memerambi) and interest in forming clubs in other towns and localities (Wooroolin, Wondai, Brooklands and possibly Nanango). In April 1930, the third annual meeting of the SBSA was held at the Home Creek Hotel, Tingoora.

This suggests the SBSA was formed in 1927 or 1928, then changed names to the Proston & District Soccer Association at the beginning of the 1935 season.

One of the earliest references to "soccer" is from July 1928, when 2 teams (a senior and junior team) from the Kingaroy Town Soccer Club visited Murgon for games.

By 1931, teams from eight towns were expected to affiliate for the season – Murgon, Byee, Proston, Hivesville, Stalworth, Memerambi, Haly Creek and Kingaroy.

In October 2021, the Nanango Soccer Club celebrated the 40th anniversary of their formation in 1980 at a COVID-postponed event at the Taras Hall in Nanango.

=== Former clubs ===
- Abbeywood
- Hivesville
- Proston
- Stalworth

=== Senior Premiers and Grand Final winners ===
Season	Women's Premiers	Women's Grand Final Winners	Men's Premiers	Men's Grand Final Winners
2021	Nanango	Nanango defeated Gunnettes (Kingaroy)	Wests (Kingaroy)	Wests (Kingaroy) defeated Nanango
2019	Nanango	Nanango 3 defeated Barambah 3 on penalties after extra time	Nanango	Nanango 4 defeated Gunners (Kingaroy) 1
2018	Nanango	Barambah 3 defeated Nanango 2	Gunners (Kingaroy)	Wests (Kingaroy) 2 defeated Barambah 1
2017	Nanango	Nanango 4 defeated Barambah 0	Nanango	Nanango 2 defeated Gunners (Kingaroy) 1
2016	Nanango	Nanango 3 defeated Barambah 0	Nanango (Undefeated)	Nanango 4 defeated Gunners (Kingaroy) 3
2015	Nanango (Undefeated)	Wests (Kingaroy) 1 defeated Nanango 0	Nanango (Undefeated)	Nanango 2 defeated Gunners (Kingaroy) 0 after extra-time, 0–0 at full time
2014	Nanango	Nanango 1 defeated Wests Kingaroy 0 after extra-time, 0–0 at full-time	Nanango (Undefeated)	Nanango 3 defeated Barambah 1
2013	Nanango	Nanango 5 defeated Wests (Kingaroy) 0	Nanango	Nanango 4 defeated Gunners (Kingaroy) 2
2012	Wests (Kingaroy)	Nanango 1 defeated Gunnettes (Kingaroy) 0	Nanango (Undefeated)	Nanango 2 defeated Wests (Kingaroy) 0
2011	Gunnettes (Kingaroy)	Gunnettes (Kingaroy) 4 defeated Barambah 0	Wests (Kingaroy)	Wests (Kingaroy) 3 defeated Gunners (Kingaroy) 0
2010	Nanango	Gunnettes (Kingaroy) 1 defeated Nanango 0	Wests (Kingaroy)	Wests (Kingaroy) 2 defeated Kingaroy United 1 after extra time, 1–1 at full time
2005	Barambah	Wests (Kingaroy) 3 defeated Easts (Kingaroy) 1	Young Guns (Kingaroy)	Young Guns (Kingaroy) 3 defeated Wests (Kingaroy) 1
2000	Nanango	Nanango 1 defeated Barambah 0	Barambah	Barambah 3 defeated Easts (Kingaroy) 0
1997	Easts (Kingaroy)	Easts (Kingaroy) defeated Nanango 3–2 on penalties after it was 0–0 at full-time and 0–0 after extra-time	Easts (Kingaroy)	Wests (Kingaroy) 2 defeated Barambah United 1 with a golden goal in extra-time after it was 1–1 at full time
1996	Easts (Kingaroy)	Easts (Kingaroy) 1 defeated Nanango 0	Easts (Kingaroy)	Easts (Kingaroy) 5 defeated Nanango 1
1995		Murgon defeated Tarantulas (Kingaroy) 4–2 on penalties after it was 0–0 at full-time and 0–0 after extra time	Nanango	Nanango 5 defeated Easts (Kingaroy) 1
1994	Nanango	Murgon 1 defeated Nanango 0	Easts (Kingaroy)	Easts (Kingaroy) 1 defeated Wests (Kingaroy) 0
1993	Kingaroy	Murgon 1 defeated Kingaroy 0	Easts (Kingaroy)	Wests (Kingaroy) 3 defeated Murgon 0
1992	Wondai	Murgon defeated Wondai 4–2 on penalties,	Easts (Kingaroy)	Easts (Kingaroy) 2 defeated Wests (Kingaroy) 0
1991	Wondai	Wondai 1 drew with Murgon 1 after extra time, 1–1 at full-time Replay – Wondai 1 defeated Murgon 0	Wests (Kingaroy)	Wests (Kingaroy) 3 defeated Easts (Kingaroy) 2
1990	Wondai (Undefeated)	Nanango 1 defeated Wondai 0	Wests (Kingaroy)	Easts (Kingaroy) 2 defeated Wests (Kingaroy) 0
1989	Wondai	Wondai 0 drew with Nanango 0 after extra time Replay – Wondai 1 defeated Nanango 0	Wests (Kingaroy)	Wests (Kingaroy) 4 defeated Nanango 0
1988	Nanango	Wondai 3 defeated Nanango 0	Wests (Kingaroy)	Easts (Kingaroy) 1 defeated Wests (Kingaroy) 0
1987	Nanango	Wondai 4 defeated Nanango 1	Wests (Kingaroy)	Wests (Kingaroy) 4 defeated Murgon 1
1986	Nanango	Nanango 2 defeated Kingaroy 1	Wests (Kingaroy)	Wests (Kingaroy) 1 defeated Murgon 0
1985	Kingaroy	Nanango 1 defeated Kingaroy 0	Wests (Kingaroy)	Wests (Kingaroy) 5 defeated Nanango 4
1984	Kingaroy	Kingaroy 2 defeated Wondai 0	Wests (Kingaroy) (Undefeated)	Wests (Kingaroy) 5 defeated Murgon 2
1983		Kingaroy 4 defeated Wondai 1	Wests (Kingaroy)	Wests (Kingaroy) 6 defeated Wondai 1
1982	Wondai (2nd)	Nanango 1 defeated Wondai 0	Kingaroy United	Wests (Kingaroy) 5 defeated Kingaroy United 4 after extra time, 3–3 at full-time
1981	Wondai (1st)	Kingaroy 1 defeated Wondai 0	Wondai (1st)	Wondai 3 defeated Nanango 1
1980	Kingaroy (1st)	Kingaroy 2 defeated Nanango 0	Nanango (2nd)	Wests (Kingaroy) 5 defeated Nanango 1
1979	No competition	No competition	Nanango (1st)	Wests (Kingaroy) 1 defeated Nanango 0
