= Football Wide Bay =

Football Queensland is recognised by both the State and Federal Governments and Football Australia as the governing body for association football in Queensland.

Football Queensland Wide Bay is the regional office of Football Queensland servicing the areas between the Sunshine Coasty and Central Queensland, including major centres such as Maryborough, Hervey Bay, Bundaberg and Monto.

== Role ==
FQ Wide Bay was established in 2021 as part of the Future of Football 2020+ Reforms.

As part of the reform journey, the local football community was invited to engage in a six-month state-wide consultation process based on improving four key areas of the game: Governance, Administration, Competitions and Affordability. Following the consultation, FQ Wide Bay was created to better reflect the geography and strategic direction of the region.

The FQ Wide Bay regional office has local committee members which are elected by clubs to meet quarterly to discuss functional and geographical matters.

== Clubs and competitions ==
The Premier competitions in the region are the FQPL Wide Bay Men’s and FQPL Wide Bay Women’s, both of which form part of the Central Conference in the Football Queensland pyramid.

Club	Home Ground	Location
Across the Waves	Across The Waves Sporting Grounds	Bundaberg
Bargara FC	Neilson Park	Bundaberg
Bay Islands United	Russell Island Sport & Recreation Park	Russell Island
Bingera FC	Bingera Football Club	Bundaberg
Brothers Aston Villa	Brothers Sports Club	Bundaberg
Diggers FC	John Cullen Park	Bundaberg
Doon Villa FC	Villa Park	Maryborough
Fraser Flames	Fraser Coast Sports Precinct	Hervey Bay
Gin Gin FC		
Granville FC	Canning Park	Maryborough
KSS Jets FC	Hervey Bay Sports Club	Hervey Bay
Maryborough West FC		
S.C. Corinthians	Martens Oval	Bundaberg
St James FC		
Sunbury Blues	Federation Park Field	Maryborough
United Park Eagles	Martens Oval	Bundaberg
Tinana FC	Federation Park Field	Maryborough
