= Football Whitsunday Coast =

Football Queensland Whitsunday Coast is the regional office of Football Queensland servicing the areas between Mackay, Moranbah, Charters Towers and Bowen. Football Queensland is recognised by both the State and Federal Governments and Football Australia as the governing body for association football in Queensland.

== Role ==
FQ Whitsunday Coast was established in 2021 as part of the Future of Football 2020+ Reforms.

As part of the reform journey, the local football community was invited to engage in a six-month state-wide consultation process based on improving four key areas of the game: Governance, Administration, Competitions and Affordability.

Following the consultation, FQ Whitsunday Coast was created to better reflect the geography and strategic direction of the region. The FQ Whitsunday Coast regional office has local committee members which are elected by clubs to meet quarterly to discuss functional and geographical matters.

== Clubs and competitions ==
The Premier competitions in the region are the FQPL Whitsunday Coast Men’s and FQPL Whitsunday Women’s, both of which form part of the Northern Conference in the Football Queensland pyramid.

Team	Home Ground	Location	Est.
Airlie Beach FC		Airlie Beach	
Blackwater Bandits			
City Brothers	Vigaro Fields	Mackay	1983
Country United	Tiger Park	Walkerston	
Crusaders FC			
Dysart Devils			
Dolphins FC	Dolphins Park	Mackay Northern Beaches	
Mackay Lions	Lions Park	Mackay	
Mackay Wanderers	Wanderers Park	Mackay	1923
Magpies Crusaders	Sologinkin Oval		
Magpies Mackay	Magpies Sporting Complex	Mackay	
Moranbah Hawks			
Rangers FC	Eric Homan Park	Mackay	1919
Whitsunday United			2019
