= Football Queensland =

Governing body for soccer in Queensland

- Abbreviation: FQ
- Formation: 1884; 142 years ago
- Headquarters: Brisbane, Queensland
- CEO: Robert Cavallucci
- Affiliations: Football Australia
- Website: www.footballqueensland.com.au

Football Queensland (FQ) is the governing body for soccer, futsal and beach soccer in the Australian state of Queensland.

Tracing its history back to the establishment of the Anglo-Queensland Football Association, in 1884, Football Queensland now has more than 250,000 participants and 308 clubs across the state.

== Role ==
Football Queensland is the sole governing body for football in Queensland with nine regional offices throughout the state:

- Football Queensland Central
- Football Queensland Darling Downs
- Football Queensland Far North & Gulf
- Football Queensland Metro (Brisbane)
- Football Queensland Northern
- Football Queensland South Coast
- Football Queensland Sunshine Coast
- Football Queensland Whitsunday Coast
- Football Queensland Wide Bay

These regional offices were established in 2021 as part of the Future of Football 2020+ Reforms to better reflect the geography and strategic direction of the regions throughout Queensland. During the reform journey, the local football community was invited to engage in a six-month state-wide consultation process based on improving four key areas of the game: Governance, Administration, Competitions and Affordability.

Each regional office has a local administrator and committee members which are elected by clubs to meet quarterly to discuss functional and geographical matters.

== Competitions ==
Football Queensland organises men’s and women’s competitions including the NPL Queensland, which acts as the top tier of football in the state.

The Football Queensland Premier League (FQPL) sits below the NPL and connects the entire state via three conferences: the SEQ Conference, Central Conference and Northern Conference.

The NPL Queensland Men sits within the SEQ Conference.

=== Men's pyramid ===
National Level	NPL Queensland Men's Pyramid								
2	NPL Queensland; 12 clubs no promotion ↓ relegate 2								
3	Football Queensland Premier League 1; 12 clubs ↑ promote 2 ↓ relegate 2								
4	Football Queensland Premier League 2; 12 Clubs ↑ promote 2 ↓ relegate 2								
5	Northern Conference			Central Conference		SEQ Conference			
5	Far North & Gulf	Northern	Whitsunday Coast	Central Coast	Wide Bay	Darling Downs	Metro	South Coast	Sunshine Coast
5	FQPL 3 Far North & Gulf	FQPL 3 Northern	FQPL 3 Whitsunday Coast	FQPL 3 Central Coast	FQPL 3 Wide Bay	FQPL 3 Darling Downs ↑ One club qualifies for FQPL 2 playoff	FQPL 3 Metro ↑ ↓ One club is promoted automatically, one qualifies for FQPL 2 playoff and two are relegated	FQPL 3 South Coast ↑ ↓ One club qualifies for FQPL 2 playoff and one relegated	FQPL 3 Sunshine Coast ↑ One club qualifies for FQPL 2 playoff
6							FQPL 4 Metro ↑ ↓ Two clubs promoted and two relegated	FQPL 4 South Coast ↑ ↓ One club promoted and one relegated	
7							FQPL 5 Metro ↑ ↓ Two clubs promoted and two relegated		
8							FQPL 6 Metro ↑ ↓ Two clubs promoted		

=== Women's pyramid ===
The NPL Queensland Women sits within the SEQ Conference.

National Level	(Queensland) SEQ Conference (Women)			
2	National Premier Leagues Queensland ↑ ↓ No promotion, two clubs relegated at the end of each season			
3	Football Queensland Premier League 1 ↑ ↓ Two clubs promoted and two relegated at the end of each season			
4	Football Queensland Premier League 2 ↑ ↓ Two clubs promoted and two relegated at the end of each season			
Regions	Darling Downs	Metro	South Coast	Sunshine Coast
Regions	↑ Play-offs for promotion-ready clubs			
5	FQPL 3 Darling Downs ↑ One club qualifies for FQPL 2 playoff	FQPL 3 Metro ↑ Two clubs qualify for FQPL 2 playoff	FQPL 3 South Coast ↑ One club qualifies for FQPL 2 playoff	FQPL 3 Sunshine Coast ↑ One club qualifies for FQPL 2 playoff

The Central Conference includes the FQPL Wide Bay and FQPL Central Coast and is connected to the rest of the state via the FQPL framework. From 2022, the top teams from each competition will play off against one another in a Champions League-style competition throughout each season to determine the Central Conference winner.

(Queensland) Central Conference (Women)
FQPL Central Coast	FQPL Wide Bay

The Northern Conference includes the FQPL Whitsunday Coast, FQPL Northern and FQPL Far North & Gulf and is connected to the rest of the state via the FQPL framework. From 2022, the top teams from each competition will play off against one another in a Champions League-style competition throughout each season to determine the Northern Conference winner.

(Queensland) Northern Conference (Women)
FQPL Whitsunday Coast	FQPL Northern	FQPL Far North & Gulf

== See also ==
- Football (soccer) in Australia
- Football (soccer) in Queensland
- History of association football in Brisbane, Queensland
