= 1981 Footscray JUST season =

Footscray JUST
1981 season
- Head Coach: Cedo Cirkovic
- Stadium: Schintler Reserve
- National Soccer League: 13th
- NSL Cup: First round
- Top goalscorer: League: Bruno Cozzella (7); All: Bruno Cozzella (8)
- Highest home attendance: 5,890 vs. South Melbourne (8 March 1981); National Soccer League
- Lowest home attendance: 1,000 vs. Sydney City (12 April 1981); National Soccer League
- Average home league attendance: 2,556
- Biggest win: 3–1 (3 times); 2–0 (twice)
- Biggest defeat: 0–5 vs. Canberra City (20 April 1981); National Soccer League

The 1981 season was the fifth in the National Soccer League for Footscray JUST. In addition to the domestic league, they also participated in the NSL Cup. Footscray JUST finished 13th in their National Soccer League season, and were eliminated in the first round of the NSL Cup.

== Players ==
Note: Flags indicate national team as defined under FIFA eligibility rules; some limited exceptions apply. Players may hold more than one non-FIFA nationality.

No.	Pos.	Nation	Player
1	GK	SCO	Dennis Boland
2	DF	YUG	Igor Hazabent
3	DF	AUS	Chris Petrov
4	DF	AUS	Kyri Kyriakouleas
5	DF	GRE	Jim Kondarios
6	MF	YUG	Slobodan Jovanovic
7	FW	AUS	Paul Simic
8	MF	AUS	Zoran Ilioski
10	FW	YUG	Dragan Vasic
11	MF	YUG	Zdravko Lujic
12	MF	YUG	Nebojsa Licanin

No.	Pos.	Nation	Player
13	MF	NZL	Johan Verweij
14	MF	AUS	Vlatko Belic
15	DF	AUS	Shaun Parton
16	DF	SCO	Jim O'Reilly
17	FW	AUS	Bruno Cozzella
18	DF	AUS	Jim Milne
—	MF	AUS	Suleiman Curovic
—	FW	AUS	Steve Kakantonis
—		AUS	Mike McIvor
—		AUS	James McLaughlin
—	GK	AUS	Steve Potter

== Competitions ==
=== Overall record ===
Competition	First match	Last match	Starting round	Final position	Record							
Competition	First match	Last match	Starting round	Final position	Pld	W	D	L	GF	GA	GD	Win %
National Soccer League	15 February 1981	13 September 1981	Matchday 1	13th	30	9	7	14	32	48	−16	30.00
NSL Cup	4 March 1981		First round	First round	1	0	0	1	1	3	−2	0.00
Total					31	9	7	15	33	51	−18	29.03

Source: Competitions

=== National Soccer League ===
==== League table ====
Pos	Team	Pld	W	D	L	GF	GA	GD	Pts	Relegation
1	Sydney City (C)	30	19	5	6	59	30	+29	43	
2	South Melbourne	30	13	13	4	41	27	+14	39	
3	Brisbane City	30	12	11	7	37	25	+12	35	
4	APIA Leichhardt	30	12	11	7	39	33	+6	35	
5	Canberra City	30	13	7	10	41	32	+9	33	
6	Brisbane Lions	30	11	11	8	41	33	+8	33	
7	Adelaide City	30	13	6	11	46	42	+4	32	
8	Heidelberg United	30	12	7	11	48	40	+8	31	
9	Sydney Olympic	30	11	9	10	46	46	0	31	
10	Newcastle KB United	30	11	8	11	41	41	0	30	
11	Wollongong City	30	8	12	10	35	39	−4	28	
12	Preston Makedonia	30	9	7	14	39	41	−2	25	
13	Footscray JUST	30	9	7	14	32	48	−16	25	
14	Marconi Fairfield	30	9	7	14	23	45	−22	25	
15	Blacktown City (R)	30	6	9	15	32	47	−15	21	Relegated to the 1982 NSW State League
16	West Adelaide	30	5	4	21	26	57	−31	14	

Updated to match(es) played on unknown. Source: rsssf.com
Rules for classification: 1) points; 2) goal difference; 3) number of goals scored.
(C) Champions; (R) Relegated

==== Results summary ====
Overall								Home						Away					
Pld	W	D	L	GF	GA	GD	Pts	W	D	L	GF	GA	GD	W	D	L	GF	GA	GD
30	9	7	14	32	48	−16	34	7	5	3	21	14	+7	2	2	11	11	34	−23

Source: worldfootball.net

==== Results by round ====
Round	1	2	3	4	5	10	6	7	8	9	11	12	13	14	15	16	17	18	19	20	21	22	23	24	25	26	27	28	29	30
Ground	A	H	A	H	A	H	H	A	H	A	A	H	H	A	H	A	H	A	H	A	H	A	H	A	H	A	A	H	A	H
Result	L	W	L	L	L	L	D	L	W	L	D	D	D	L	W	L	D	L	W	W	W	L	W	W	D	L	L	W	D	L
Position	16	9	13	14	15	16	16	16	15	15	15	16	16	16	15	15	15	15	14	13	13	13	13	12	13	13	14	13	13	13
Points	0	2	2	2	2	2	3	3	5	5	6	7	8	8	10	10	11	11	13	15	17	17	19	21	22	22	22	24	25	25

Source: worldfootball.net
A = Away; H = Home; W = Win; D = Draw; L = Loss

==== Matches ====
Win Draw Loss

15 February 1981 1	Newcastle KB United	3–0	Footscray JUST	Newcastle
	Buckley 9'; McClelland 25', 31'	Report		Stadium: Newcastle International Sports Centre; Attendance: 5,619; Referee: Jim Reeves

22 February 1981 2	Footscray JUST	2–1	APIA Leichhardt	Melbourne
	Kondarios 15'; Vasic 44'	Report	O'Connor 24'	Stadium: Schintler Reserve; Attendance: 1,951; Referee: Stewart Mellings

1 March 1981 3	Wollongong City	2–1	Footscray JUST	Wollongong
	Tredinnick 71'; Dunleavy 85'	Report	Cozzella 78'	Stadium: Wollongong Showground; Attendance: 5,317; Referee: Tim Davies

8 March 1981 4	Footscray JUST	1–2	South Melbourne	Melbourne
	Ilioski 11'	Report	Christopoulos 20'; Evans 68'	Stadium: Schintler Reserve; Attendance: 5,890; Referee: David Yelland

15 March 1981 5	Preston Makedonia	3–0	Footscray JUST	Melbourne
	Ollerton 42', 71'; Cullen 61'	Report		Stadium: B.T. Connor Reserve; Attendance: 4,500; Referee: Chris Bambridge

22 March 1981 10	Footscray JUST	1–2	Marconi Fairfield	Melbourne
	Ilioski 71'	Report	Sharne 62'; Muir 80'	Stadium: Schintler Reserve; Attendance: 2,000; Referee: Jim Fearn

29 March 1981 6	Footscray JUST	1–1	Adelaide City	Melbourne
	Cozzella 28'	Report	Mitchell 59'	Stadium: Schintler Reserve; Attendance: 2,000; Referee: Evan Venios

5 April 1981 7	Brisbane City	2–0	Footscray JUST	Brisbane
	P. Wilkinson 71'; Conner 80'	Report		Stadium: Spencer Park; Attendance: 1,600; Referee: Jack Wood

12 April 1981 8	Footscray JUST	1–0	Sydney City	Melbourne
	Belic 67'	Report		Stadium: Schintler Reserve; Attendance: 1,000; Referee: Dennis Voutsinas

20 April 1981 9	Canberra City	5–0	Footscray JUST	Canberra
	Brennan 1'; Gibson 43', 66', 80'; Maclaren 78'	Report		Stadium: Bruce Stadium; Attendance: 6,190; Referee: Bob Mee

3 May 1981 11	Sydney Olympic	0–0	Footscray JUST	Sydney
		Report		Stadium: Pratten Park; Attendance: 5,675; Referee: Peter Rampley

10 May 1981 12	Footscray JUST	2–2	Heidelberg United	Melbourne
	Belic 19'; Jovanovic 62'	Report	Monagle 64'; McGrory 82'	Stadium: Schintler Reserve; Attendance: 3,500; Referee: Stewart Mellings

17 May 1981 13	Footscray JUST	1–1	West Adelaide	Melbourne
	Belic 28'	Report	Forde 24'	Stadium: Schintler Reserve; Attendance: 2,000; Referee: Jim Fearn

24 May 1981 14	Brisbane Lions	4–0	Footscray JUST	Melbourne
	Latchford 24', 62'; Millman 27'; Low 32'	Report		Stadium: Richlands Stadium; Attendance: 3,000; Referee: Jack Wood

31 May 1981 15	Footscray JUST	2–0	Blacktown City	Melbourne
	Ilioski 53'; Kakantonis 85'	Report		Stadium: Schintler Reserve; Attendance: 2,300; Referee: Jim Fearn

7 June 1981 16	APIA Leichhardt	2–0	Footscray JUST	Sydney
15:00 AEST	Wilson 84'; Soper 86'	Report		Stadium: Lambert Park; Attendance: 3,482; Referee: Alf Rodway

14 June 1981 17	Footscray JUST	1–1	Wollongong City	Melbourne
	Verweij 78'	Report	Adam 87' (pen.)	Stadium: Schintler Reserve; Attendance: 2,000; Referee: Bob Kerr

21 June 1981 18	South Melbourne	2–1	Footscray JUST	Melbourne
	Wooddin 30'; Christopoulos 40' (pen.)	Report	Verweij 90'	Stadium: Middle Park Soccer Stadium; Attendance: 4,500; Referee: Jim Fearn

28 June 1981 19	Footscray JUST	2–1	Preston Makedonia	Melbourne
	Ilioski 10'; Milne 87'	Report	Cullen 73'	Stadium: Schintler Reserve; Attendance: 5,000; Referee: Tim Davies

5 July 1981 20	Adelaide City	1–3	Footscray JUST	Adelaide
	J. Nyskohus 59'	Report	Ilioski 15'; Cozzella 82', 84'	Stadium: Olympic Sports Field; Attendance: 3,300; Referee: Don Campbell

12 July 1981 21	Footscray JUST	1–0	Brisbane City	Melbourne
	Verweij 12'	Report		Stadium: Schintler Reserve; Attendance: 1,800; Referee: Chris Bambridge

19 July 1981 22	Sydney City	3–0	Footscray JUST	Sydney
	Watson 10'; Boden 69'; Barnes 81'	Report		Stadium: ES Marks Athletics Field; Attendance: 3,427; Referee: Ken Allen

26 July 1981 23	Footscray JUST	3–1	Canberra City	Melbourne
	Ilioski 39' (pen.); Kondarios 59'; Cozzella 71'	Report	R. O'Shea 84'	Stadium: Schintler Reserve; Attendance: 2,300; Referee: Evan Venios

2 August 1981 24	Marconi Fairfield	1–3	Footscray JUST	Sydney
	Jankovics 79'	Report	Verweij 7'; Cozzella 47'; Lujic 84'	Stadium: Marconi Stadium; Attendance: 3,450; Referee: Richard Lorenc

9 August 1981 25	Footscray JUST	1–1	Sydney Olympic	Melbourne
	Kakantonis 60'	Report	Redfern 79'	Stadium: Schintler Reserve; Attendance: 1,300; Referee: David Yelland

16 August 1981 26	Heidelberg United	2–0	Footscray JUST	Melbourne
	Paton 84'; Cole 88'	Report		Stadium: Olympic Park; Attendance: 4,000; Referee: Graham Neal

23 August 1981 27	West Adelaide	3–2	Footscray JUST	Adelaide
	Honeyman 30'; Topaz 64'; Lorenzoni 80'	Report	Verweij 29'; Lujic 63'	Stadium: Hindmarsh Stadium; Attendance: 2,500; Referee: Bob Kerr

30 August 1981 28	Footscray JUST	2–0	Brisbane Lions	Melbourne
	Cozzella 37'; Lujic 50'	Report		Stadium: Schintler Reserve; Attendance: 2,500; Referee: Chris Bambridge

6 September 1981 29	Blacktown City	1–1	Footscray JUST	Sydney
	Krstic 90'	Report	Boland 27' (pen.)	Stadium: Gabbie Stadium; Attendance: 2,040; Referee: Jim Reeves

13 September 1981 30	Footscray JUST	0–1	Newcastle KB United	Melbourne
		Report	Heys 50'	Stadium: Schintler Reserve; Attendance: 2,800; Referee: Stewart Mellings

=== NSL Cup ===
Win Draw Loss

4 March 1981	Preston Makedonia	3–1	Footscray JUST	Melbourne
	Ollerton 73', 85' (pen.); Brown 81'	Report	Cozzella 68'	Stadium: Olympic Park; Attendance: 3,500; Referee: Chris Bambridge

== Statistics ==
=== Appearances and goals ===
Includes all competitions. Players with no appearances not included in the list.

No.	Pos.	Nat.	Player	National Soccer League		NSL Cup		Total	
No.	Pos.	Nat.	Player	Apps	Goals	Apps	Goals	Apps	Goals
1	GK	(Scotland)	Dennis Boland	29	1	1	0	30	1
2	DF	(Socialist Federal Republic of Yugoslavia)	Igor Hazabent	21+4	0	1	0	26	0
3	DF	(Australia)	Chris Petrov	6+2	0	1	0	9	0
4	DF	(Australia)	Kyri Kyriakouleas	24+1	0	1	0	26	0
5	DF	(Greece)	Jim Kondarios	29	3	1	0	30	3
6	MF	(Socialist Federal Republic of Yugoslavia)	Slobodan Jovanovic	26	1	1	0	27	1
7	FW	(Australia)	Paul Simic	5+3	0	1	0	9	0
8	MF	(Australia)	Zoran Ilioski	27+1	6	1	0	29	6
10	FW	(Socialist Federal Republic of Yugoslavia)	Dragan Vasic	5+3	1	0+1	0	9	1
11	MF	(Socialist Federal Republic of Yugoslavia)	Zdravko Lujic	19	3	0	0	19	3
12	MF	(Socialist Federal Republic of Yugoslavia)	Nebojsa Licanin	5	0	0	0	5	0
13	MF	(New Zealand)	Johan Verweij	14	5	0	0	14	5
14	MF	(Australia)	Vlatko Belic	15+4	3	0+1	0	20	3
15	DF	(Australia)	Shaun Parton	0+1	0	0	0	1	0
16	DF	(Scotland)	Jim O'Reilly	20	0	0	0	20	0
17	FW	(Australia)	Bruno Cozzella	23+4	7	1	1	28	8
18	DF	(Australia)	Jim Milne	25+1	1	1	0	27	1
—	MF	(Australia)	Suleiman Curovic	3+4	0	0	0	7	0
—	FW	(Australia)	Steve Kakantonis	22+2	1	0	0	24	1
—	—	(Australia)	Mike McIvor	3	0	0	0	3	0
—	—	(Australia)	James McLaughlin	3+1	0	0	0	4	0
—	GK	(Australia)	Steve Potter	1+1	0	0	0	2	0
Player(s) transferred out but featured this season
9	MF	(Australia)	Josip Picioane	5	0	1	0	6	0

=== Disciplinary record ===
Includes all competitions. The list is sorted by squad number when total cards are equal. Players with no cards not included in the list.

Rank	No.	Pos.	Nat.	Player	National Soccer League			NSL Cup			Total		
Rank	No.	Pos.	Nat.	Player	Yellow card	Second yellow card	Red card	Yellow card	Second yellow card	Red card	Yellow card	Second yellow card	Red card
1	2	DF	(Socialist Federal Republic of Yugoslavia)	Igor Hazabent	6	0	1	0	0	0	6	0	1
1	4	DF	(Australia)	Kyri Kyriakouleas	6	0	1	0	0	0	6	0	1
3	14	MF	(Australia)	Vlatko Belic	6	0	1	0	0	0	6	0	1
4	—	FW	(Australia)	Steve Kakantonis	4	0	0	0	0	0	4	0	0
5	6	MF	(Socialist Federal Republic of Yugoslavia)	Slobodan Jovanovic	2	0	0	0	0	0	2	0	0
5	9	MF	(Australia)	Josip Picioane	2	0	0	0	0	0	2	0	0
5	16	DF	(Scotland)	Jim O'Reilly	2	0	0	0	0	0	2	0	0
8	1	GK	(Scotland)	Dennis Boland	1	0	0	0	0	0	1	0	0
8	5	DF	(Greece)	Jim Kondarios	1	0	0	0	0	0	1	0	0
8	11	MF	(Socialist Federal Republic of Yugoslavia)	Zdravko Lujic	1	0	0	0	0	0	1	0	0
8	12	MF	(Socialist Federal Republic of Yugoslavia)	Nebojsa Licanin	1	0	0	0	0	0	1	0	0
8	15	DF	(Australia)	Shaun Parton	1	0	0	0	0	0	1	0	0
8	18	DF	(Australia)	Jim Milne	1	0	0	0	0	0	1	0	0
Total					30	0	3	0	0	0	30	0	3

=== Clean sheets ===
Includes all competitions. The list is sorted by squad number when total clean sheets are equal. Numbers in parentheses represent games where both goalkeepers participated and both kept a clean sheet; the number in parentheses is awarded to the goalkeeper who was substituted on, whilst a full clean sheet is awarded to the goalkeeper who was on the field at the start of play. Goalkeepers with no clean sheets not included in the list.

Rank	No.	Nat.	Goalkeeper	NSL	NSL Cup	Total
1	1	(Australia)	Dennis Boland	4	0	4
Total				4	0	4
