= 1981 Preston Makedonia FC season =

Preston Makedonia
1981 season
- President: John Brian
- Head Coach: Brian Edgeley; Peter Ollerton
- Stadium: B.T. Connor Reserve
- National Soccer League: 12th
- NSL Cup: Second round
- Top goalscorer: League: Peter Ollerton (10); All: Peter Ollerton (12)
- Highest home attendance: 6,000 vs. South Melbourne (3 May 1981); National Soccer League; 6,000 vs. Sydney City (6 September 1981); National Soccer League
- Lowest home attendance: 2,000 vs. Brisbane City (24 May 1981); National Soccer League
- Average home league attendance: 3,750
- Biggest win: 6–0 vs. Wollongong City (2 August 1981); National Soccer League
- Biggest defeat: 0–4 vs. Newcastle KB United (12 April 1981); National Soccer League; 0–4 vs. West Adelaide (10 May 1981); National Soccer League
Home colours

The 1981 season was the first in the National Soccer League for Preston Makedonia, in Melbourne, Victoria. In addition to the domestic league, they also participated in the NSL Cup. Preston Makedonia finished 12th in their National Soccer League season and were eliminated in the second round of the NSL Cup.

== Players ==
Note: Flags indicate national team as defined under FIFA eligibility rules; some limited exceptions apply. Players may hold more than one non-FIFA nationality.

No.	Pos.	Nation	Player
1	GK	AUS	Lou Kastner
2	DF	AUS	Mike Rainey
3	DF	ENG	Steve Beech
4	MF	AUS	Peter Ollerton
5	DF	ENG	John Higham
6	MF	AUS	Jeff Faulkner
7	FW	AUS	Robbie Cullen
8	MF	SCO	Gordon Flavell
9	FW	SCO	George McMillan
10	MF	AUS	Ljube Petrovski
11	FW	AUS	Gary Ward
12	MF	AUS	Stuart Cunningham

No.	Pos.	Nation	Player
13	MF	AUS	Claude Lucchesi
14	MF	NZL	Eric Lesbirel
15	MF	AUS	Con Stoikos
16	FW	AUS	Con Opasinis
—	FW	AUS	Peter Boyle
—	FW	AUS	Duggie Brown
—		AUS	Gary Clayton
—	MF	AUS	John Little
—		AUS	Danny McCluskey
—	DF	SCO	Ron McIvor
—	FW	ENG	Alan Whittle
—	GK	NZL	Richard Wilson

== Competitions ==
=== Overall record ===
Competition	First match	Last match	Starting round	Final position	Record							
Competition	First match	Last match	Starting round	Final position	Pld	W	D	L	GF	GA	GD	Win %
National Soccer League	15 February 1981	13 September 1981	Matchday 1	12th	30	9	7	14	39	41	−2	30.00
NSL Cup	4 March 1981	25 March 1981	First round	Second round	2	1	1	0	4	2	+2	50.00
Total					32	10	8	14	43	43	+0	31.25

Source: Competitions

=== National Soccer League ===
==== League table ====
Pos	Team	Pld	W	D	L	GF	GA	GD	Pts	Relegation
1	Sydney City (C)	30	19	5	6	59	30	+29	43	
2	South Melbourne	30	13	13	4	41	27	+14	39	
3	Brisbane City	30	12	11	7	37	25	+12	35	
4	APIA Leichhardt	30	12	11	7	39	33	+6	35	
5	Canberra City	30	13	7	10	41	32	+9	33	
6	Brisbane Lions	30	11	11	8	41	33	+8	33	
7	Adelaide City	30	13	6	11	46	42	+4	32	
8	Heidelberg United	30	12	7	11	48	40	+8	31	
9	Sydney Olympic	30	11	9	10	46	46	0	31	
10	Newcastle KB United	30	11	8	11	41	41	0	30	
11	Wollongong City	30	8	12	10	35	39	−4	28	
12	Preston Makedonia	30	9	7	14	39	41	−2	25	
13	Footscray JUST	30	9	7	14	32	48	−16	25	
14	Marconi Fairfield	30	9	7	14	23	45	−22	25	
15	Blacktown City (R)	30	6	9	15	32	47	−15	21	Relegated to the 1982 NSW State League
16	West Adelaide	30	5	4	21	26	57	−31	14	

Updated to match(es) played on unknown. Source: rsssf.com
Rules for classification: 1) points; 2) goal difference; 3) number of goals scored.
(C) Champions; (R) Relegated

==== Results summary ====
Overall								Home						Away					
Pld	W	D	L	GF	GA	GD	Pts	W	D	L	GF	GA	GD	W	D	L	GF	GA	GD
30	9	7	14	39	41	−2	34	7	4	4	28	14	+14	2	3	10	11	27	−16

Source: worldfootball.net

==== Results by round ====
Round	1	2	3	4	5	6	7	8	9	10	11	12	13	14	15	16	17	18	19	20	21	22	23	24	25	26	27	28	29	30
Ground	H	A	H	A	H	A	H	A	H	A	H	A	A	H	A	H	A	H	A	H	A	H	A	H	A	H	H	A	H	A
Result	L	L	W	W	W	L	L	L	W	D	D	L	L	D	L	D	L	L	L	D	D	W	D	W	L	W	W	W	L	L
Position	12	16	8	8	6	8	9	11	10	11	9	12	12	12	12	14	14	14	15	15	15	14	14	14	14	14	13	12	12	12
Points	0	0	2	4	6	6	6	6	8	9	10	10	10	11	11	12	12	12	12	13	14	16	17	19	19	21	23	25	25	25

Source: worldfootball.net
A = Away; H = Home; W = Win; D = Draw; L = Loss

==== Matches ====
Win Draw Loss

15 February 1981 1	Preston Makedonia	0–1	Canberra City	Melbourne
		Report	R. O'Shea 23'	Stadium: B.T. Connor Reserve; Attendance: 4,000; Referee: Jim Fearn

22 February 1981 2	Marconi Fairfield	1–0	Preston Makedonia	Sydney
	Krncevic 66'	Report		Stadium: Marconi Oval; Attendance: 4,500; Referee: Gary Power

1 March 1981 3	Preston Makedonia	3–1	Sydney Olympic	Melbourne
	Cullen 22'; Lucchesi 49'; Brown 85'	Report	Katholos 64'	Stadium: B.T. Connor Reserve; Attendance: 3,000; Referee: Evan Venios

8 March 1981 4	Heidelberg United	2–3	Preston Makedonia	Melbourne
	Paton 71', 77'	Report	Ward 3'; Ollerton 8'; Brown 77'	Stadium: Olympic Park; Attendance: 8,000; Referee: Dennis Voutsinas

15 March 1981 5	Preston Makedonia	3–0	Footscray JUST	Melbourne
	Ollerton 42', 71'; Cullen 61'	Report		Stadium: B.T. Connor Reserve; Attendance: 4,500; Referee: Chris Bambridge

29 March 1981 6	Brisbane Lions	2–1	Preston Makedonia	Brisbane
	Hogg 10'; Bryce 27'	Report	Cullen 64'	Stadium: Richlands Stadium; Attendance: 1,830; Referee: Col Amos

5 April 1981 7	Preston Makedonia	2–3	Blacktown City	Melbourne
	Ollerton 49', 65'	Report	Cuk 22'; Wallace 54', 74'	Stadium: B.T. Connor Reserve; Attendance: 3,500; Referee: David Yelland

12 April 1981 8	Newcastle KB United	4–0	Preston Makedonia	Newcastle
	Mountford 3', 75'; Senkalski 51'; Bertogna 64'	Report		Stadium: Newcastle International Sports Centre; Attendance: 4,278; Referee: Alf Rodway

19 April 1981 9	Preston Makedonia	3–1	APIA Leichhardt	Melbourne
	Higham 11'; Ollerton 30'; Brown 53'	Report	Giampaolo 19'	Stadium: B.T. Connor Reserve; Attendance: 3,500; Referee: Stewart Mellings

26 April 1981 10	Wollongong City	2–2	Preston Makedonia	Wollongong
15:00 AEST	Fleming 46'; Fontana 49'	Report	Ollerton 7'; Little 75'	Stadium: Wollongong Showground; Attendance: 6,930; Referee: Doug Rennie

3 May 1981 11	Preston Makedonia	1–1	South Melbourne	Melbourne
	Little 89'	Report	Buljevic 42'	Stadium: B.T. Connor Reserve; Attendance: 6,000; Referee: Don Campbell

10 May 1981 12	West Adelaide	4–0	Preston Makedonia	Adelaide
	Topaz 18'; Honeyman 27'; Boyle 39'; Manecas 64'	Report		Stadium: Hindmarsh Stadium; Attendance: 2,200; Referee: Bobby Kerr

17 May 1981 13	Adelaide City	1–0	Preston Makedonia	Adelaide
	J. Nyskohus 26'	Report		Stadium: Olympic Sports Field; Attendance: 2,200; Referee: Graham Neal

24 May 1981 14	Preston Makedonia	1–1	Brisbane City	Melbourne
	Cullen 50'	Report	Hamilton 87'	Stadium: B.T. Connor Reserve; Attendance: 2,000; Referee: Stewart Mellings

31 May 1981 15	Sydney City	2–0	Preston Makedonia	Sydney
	Souness 18' (pen.); Watson 57'	Report		Stadium: ES Marks Athletics Field; Attendance: 1,492; Referee: Tim Davies

7 June 1981 16	Preston Makedonia	0–0	Marconi Fairfield	Melbourne
		Report		Stadium: B.T. Connor Reserve; Referee: Jack Johnston

14 June 1981 17	Sydney Olympic	2–1	Preston Makedonia	Sydney
	Koussas 33'; Jennings 38'	Report	Whittle 70'	Stadium: Pratten Park; Attendance: 6,150; Referee: Tony Boskovic

21 June 1981 18	Preston Makedonia	0–2	Heidelberg United	Melbourne
		Report	Paton 60'; Cole 70'	Stadium: B.T. Connor Reserve; Attendance: 5,000; Referee: Chris Bambridge

28 June 1981 19	Footscray JUST	2–1	Preston Makedonia	Melbourne
	Ilioski 10'; Milne 87'	Report	Cullen 73'	Stadium: Schintler Reserve; Attendance: 5,000; Referee: Tim Davies

5 July 1981 20	Preston Makedonia	1–1	Brisbane Lions	Melbourne
	Ollerton 88'	Report	Ferris 77'	Stadium: B.T. Connor Reserve; Attendance: 3,000; Referee: Stewart Mellings

12 July 1981 21	Blacktown City	0–0	Preston Makedonia	Sydney
		Report		Stadium: Gabbie Stadium; Attendance: 3,067; Referee: Doug Rennie

19 July 1981 22	Preston Makedonia	3–1	Newcastle KB United	Melbourne
	Lucchesi 45'; Brown 49'; Flavell 72'	Report		Stadium: B.T. Connor Reserve; Attendance: 3,000; Referee: Jim Fearn

26 July 1981 23	APIA Leichhardt	1–1	Preston Makedonia	Sydney
	Soper 75'	Report	Lucchesi 40'	Stadium: Lambert Park; Attendance: 4,111; Referee: Jim Reeves

2 August 1981 24	Preston Makedonia	6–0	Wollongong City	Melbourne
	Lucchesi 11', 23'; Whittle 59'; Brown 75'; Fontana 80' (o.g.); Cullen 89'	Report		Stadium: B.T. Connor Reserve; Attendance: 3,000; Referee: Stewart Mellings

9 August 1981 25	South Melbourne	2–0	Preston Makedonia	Melbourne
	Evans 49'; Shirra 71'	Report		Stadium: Middle Park Soccer Stadium; Attendance: 11,759; Referee: Jim Fearn

16 August 1981 26	Preston Makedonia	2–0	West Adelaide	Melbourne
	Brown 83'; Lucchesi 84'	Report		Stadium: B.T. Connor Reserve; Attendance: 2,500; Referee: Chris Bambridge

23 August 1981 27	Preston Makedonia	3–0	Adelaide City	Melbourne
	Ollerton 15' (pen.); Lucchesi 42'; Brown 73'	Report		Stadium: B.T. Connor Reserve; Attendance: 3,500; Referee: Evan Venios

30 August 1981 28	Brisbane City	1–2	Preston Makedonia	Brisbane
	Hamilton 83'	Report	Lucchesi 3'; Ollerton 37'	Stadium: Spencer Park; Attendance: 2,500; Referee: Col Amos

6 September 1981 29	Preston Makedonia	0–2	Sydney City	Melbourne
		Report	Barnes 27'; Kosmina 57'	Stadium: B.T. Connor Reserve; Attendance: 6,000; Referee: Jack Johnston

13 September 1981 30	Canberra City	1–0	Preston Makedonia	Canberra
	Gibson 10'	Report		Stadium: Bruce Stadium; Attendance: 3,142; Referee: Jim Fearn

=== NSL Cup ===
Win Draw Loss

4 March 1981 First round	Preston Makedonia	3–1	Footscray JUST	Melbourne
	Ollerton 73', 85' (pen.); Brown 81'	Report	Cozzella 68'	Stadium: Olympic Park; Attendance: 3,500; Referee: Chris Bambridge

25 March 1981 Second round	Heidelberg United	1–1 (a.e.t.) (5–3 p)	Preston Makedonia	Melbourne
	Cole 63'	Report	McMillan 52'	Stadium: Olympic Park; Attendance: 6,000; Referee: Bob Mee
	Penalties
	Cole (penalty scored); Yzendoorn (penalty scored); Taylor (penalty scored); Campbell (penalty scored); Rooney (penalty scored)		(penalty scored) Ollerton; (penalty missed) Flavell; (penalty scored) Petrovski; (penalty scored) Lucchesi

== Statistics ==
=== Appearances and goals ===
Includes all competitions. Players with no appearances not included in the list.

No.	Pos.	Nat.	Player	National Soccer League		NSL Cup		Total	
No.	Pos.	Nat.	Player	Apps	Goals	Apps	Goals	Apps	Goals
1	GK	(Australia)	Lou Kastner	14	0	2	0	16	0
2	DF	(Australia)	Mike Rainey	26	0	1+1	0	28	0
3	DF	(England)	Steve Beech	27	0	2	0	29	0
4	MF	(Australia)	Peter Ollerton	25+3	10	2	2	30	12
5	DF	(England)	John Higham	15+1	1	2	0	18	1
6	MF	(Australia)	Jeff Faulkner	15+3	0	2	0	20	0
7	FW	(Australia)	Robbie Cullen	22+3	6	2	0	27	6
8	MF	(Scotland)	Gordon Flavell	24+2	1	1	0	27	1
9	FW	(Scotland)	George McMillan	21+4	0	1	1	26	1
10	MF	(Australia)	Ljube Petrovski	25	0	2	0	27	0
11	FW	(Australia)	Gary Ward	2+1	1	0+1	0	4	1
13	MF	(Australia)	Claude Lucchesi	25+3	8	2	0	30	8
14	MF	(New Zealand)	Eric Lesbirel	0+1	0	0	0	1	0
15	MF	(Australia)	Con Stoikos	0+4	0	0	0	4	0
—	FW	(Australia)	Peter Boyle	11	0	0	0	11	0
—	FW	(Australia)	Duggie Brown	24+1	7	2	1	27	8
—	—	(Australia)	Gary Clayton	6	0	0	0	6	0
—	MF	(Australia)	John Little	2+11	2	1	0	14	2
—	—	(Australia)	Danny McCluskey	2	0	0	0	2	0
—	DF	(Scotland)	Ron McIvor	2+3	0	0	0	5	0
—	FW	(England)	Alan Whittle	20	2	0	0	20	2
—	GK	(New Zealand)	Richard Wilson	10	0	0	0	10	0

=== Disciplinary record ===
Includes all competitions. The list is sorted by squad number when total cards are equal. Players with no cards not included in the list.

Rank	No.	Pos.	Nat.	Player	National Soccer League			NSL Cup			Total		
Rank	No.	Pos.	Nat.	Player	Yellow card	Second yellow card	Red card	Yellow card	Second yellow card	Red card	Yellow card	Second yellow card	Red card
1	4	MF	(Australia)	Peter Ollerton	6	0	1	0	0	0	6	0	1
2	—	FW	(Australia)	Duggie Brown	5	0	1	0	0	0	5	0	1
3	2	DF	(Australia)	Mike Rainey	2	0	1	0	0	0	2	0	1
3	10	MF	(Australia)	Ljube Petrovski	2	0	1	0	0	0	2	0	1
4	7	FW	(Australia)	Robbie Cullen	1	0	1	0	0	0	1	0	1
5	9	FW	(Scotland)	George McMillan	5	0	0	0	0	0	5	0	0
6	3	DF	(England)	Steve Beech	4	0	0	0	0	0	4	0	0
7	13	MF	(Australia)	Claude Lucchesi	3	0	0	0	0	0	3	0	0
7	—	FW	(Australia)	Peter Boyle	3	0	0	0	0	0	3	0	0
9	6	MF	(Australia)	Jeff Faulkner	2	0	0	0	0	0	2	0	0
10	5	DF	(Australia)	John Higham	1	0	0	0	0	0	1	0	0
10	8	MF	(Scotland)	Gordon Flavell	1	0	0	0	0	0	1	0	0
10	—	GK	(New Zealand)	Richard Wilson	1	0	0	0	0	0	1	0	0
Total					36	0	5	0	0	0	36	0	5

=== Clean sheets ===
Includes all competitions. The list is sorted by squad number when total clean sheets are equal. Numbers in parentheses represent games where both goalkeepers participated and both kept a clean sheet; the number in parentheses is awarded to the goalkeeper who was substituted on, whilst a full clean sheet is awarded to the goalkeeper who was on the field at the start of play. Goalkeepers with no clean sheets not included in the list.

Rank	No.	Nat.	Goalkeeper	NSL	NSL Cup	Total
1	—	(New Zealand)	Richard Wilson	3	0	3
2	1	(Australia)	Lou Kostner	2	0	2
3	—	(Australia)	Gary Clayton	1	0	1
Total				6	0	6
