= 1977 Canberra City FC season =

Canberra City
1977 season
- Manager: Johnny Warren
- Stadium: Manuka Oval; Seiffert Oval
- National Soccer League: 13th
- NSL Cup: Quarter-finals
- Top goalscorer: League: Ivan Grujicic; Tony Henderson (4 each); All: Tony Henderson (5)
- Highest home attendance: 2,500 vs. West Adelaide (2 April 1977); National Soccer League; 2,500 vs. St George-Budapest (4 June 1977); National Soccer League
- Lowest home attendance: 1,000 vs. St George-Budapest (21 September 1977); NSL Cup
- Average home league attendance: 1,754
- Biggest win: 4–0 vs. Sydney Olympic (H) (30 July 1977); National Soccer League
- Biggest defeat: 1–5 vs. Marconi Fairfield (A) (3 October 1977); NSL Cup

The 1977 season was the first in the history of Canberra City Football Club. In addition to the domestic league, they also participated in the NSL Cup.

== Players ==
Note: Flags indicate national team as defined under FIFA eligibility rules; some limited exceptions apply. Players may hold more than one non-FIFA nationality.

No.	Pos.	Nation	Player
1	GK	ENG	Ron Tilsed
2	DF	AUS	Danny Moulis
3	DF	SCO	John Brown
4	DF	AUS	Tony Henderson
5		AUS	Nick Boskov
8	MF	YUG	Ivan Grujicic
9	FW	AUS	Brian Stoddart
10	FW	AUS	Adrian Alston
11		AUS	Michael Black
12	MF	AUS	Alan Bourke
14	MF	AUS	Jimmy Cant
15	DF	FIJ	Keni Kawaleva

No.	Pos.	Nation	Player
16	DF	AUS	Steve Hogg
17	MF	ARG	Vic Fernandez
18	DF	ENG	Roy Stark
19	FW	ENG	Dave O'Connor
—	MF	AUS	John Davies
—	GK	AUS	Malcolm Haynes
—	DF	AUS	Steve Kojsza
—		AUS	Oscar Langone
—		ARG	Luis Salgado
—	MF	SCO	John Stoddart
—		AUS	Greg Willet

== Pre-season and friendlies ==
Win Draw Loss

26–27 March 1977	Canberra City (Australia)	2–0	(Australia) Footscray JUST	Canberra
	Henderson 25'; Stoddart 39'	Report		Stadium: Manuka Oval; Attendance: 200; Referee: Dennis McDermott

== Competitions ==
=== Overview ===
Competition	First match	Last match	Starting round	Final position	Record							
Competition	First match	Last match	Starting round	Final position	Pld	W	D	L	GF	GA	GD	Win %
National Soccer League	2 April 1977	24 September 1977	Matchday 1	13th	26	5	7	14	22	39	−17	19.23
NSL Cup	21 September 1977	3 October 1977	First round	Quarter-finals	2	1	0	1	3	6	−3	50.00
Total					28	6	7	15	25	45	−20	21.43

Source: Competitions

=== National Soccer League ===
==== League table ====
Pos	Team	Pld	W	D	L	GF	GA	GD	Pts	Relegation
10	Brisbane City	26	8	6	12	30	35	−5	22	
11	South Melbourne	26	7	8	11	27	35	−8	22	
12	Sydney Olympic	26	7	7	12	25	38	−13	21	
13	Canberra City	26	5	7	14	22	39	−17	17	
14	Mooroolbark (R)	26	5	5	16	31	61	−30	15	Relegation to the 1978 Victoria Metropolitan League Three

Source: rsssf.com
Rules for classification: 1) Points; 2) Goal difference; 3) Goals scored
(R) Relegated

==== Results summary ====
Overall								Home						Away					
Pld	W	D	L	GF	GA	GD	Pts	W	D	L	GF	GA	GD	W	D	L	GF	GA	GD
26	5	7	14	22	39	−17	22	3	3	7	13	19	−6	2	4	7	9	20	−11

Source: worldfootball.net

==== Results by round ====
Round	1	2	3	4	5	6	7	8	9	10	11	13	14	15	12	16	17	18	19	20	21	22	23	24	25	26
Ground	H	A	A	H	A	H	A	H	A	H	A	A	H	A	H	A	H	H	A	H	A	H	A	H	A	H
Result	L	W	L	L	D	L	L	W	D	D	L	L	L	D	L	L	D	W	L	L	W	W	L	D	D	L
Position	11	7	10	12	12	12	13	12	12	12	12	12	14	13	12	13	13	13	13	13	13	13	13	13	13	13
Points	0	2	2	2	3	3	3	5	6	7	7	7	7	8	8	8	9	11	11	11	13	15	15	16	17	17

Source: worldfootball.net
A = Away; H = Home; W = Win; D = Draw; L = Loss

==== Matches ====
Win Draw Loss

2 April 1977 1	Canberra City	1–3	West Adelaide	Canberra
	Grujicic 76'	Report	Kosmina 7'; Jones 48'; McGachey 52'	Stadium: Manuka Oval; Attendance: 2,500; Referee: Dennis McDermott

10 April 1977 2	Brisbane Lions	0–1	Canberra City	Brisbane
		Report	B. Stoddart 51'	Stadium: Perry Park; Attendance: 4,178; Referee: Jack Wood

17 April 1977 3	Adelaide City	2–0	Canberra City	Adelaide
	Perin 25' (pen.); Nyskohus 41'	Report		Stadium: Olympic Sports Field; Attendance: 7,000; Referee: Graham Neal

23 April 1977 4	Canberra City	0–3	Western Suburbs	Canberra
		Report	Norris 24', 86'; Fryer 36'	Stadium: Manuka Oval; Attendance: 2,000; Referee: Peter Rampley

1 May 1977 5	Sydney Olympic	2–2	Canberra City	Sydney
	D. Allan 3'; Botham 56'	Report	B. Stoddart 22'; Henderson 81'	Stadium: Wentworth Park; Attendance: 3,616; Referee: Brian Fowler

7 May 1977 6	Canberra City	0–1	Fitzroy United	Canberra
		Report	Buljevic 89'	Stadium: Manuka Oval; Attendance: 2,000; Referee: Harold Hall

15 May 1977 7	Footscray JUST	3–0	Canberra City	Melbourne
	Kondarios 46'; Picioane 47'; Palinkas 54'	Report		Stadium: Olympic Park Stadium; Attendance: 2,180; Referee: Stewart Mellings

21 May 1977 8	Canberra City	2–0	Brisbane City	Canberra
		Report		Stadium: Manuka Oval; Referee: Richard Lorenc

28 May 1977 9	Marconi Fairfield	0–0	Canberra City	Sydney
		Report		Stadium: Marconi Stadium; Attendance: 2,243; Referee: Bill Jones

4 June 1977 10	Canberra City	2–2	St George-Budapest	Sydney
	B. Stoddart 15'; Grujicic 21'	Report	O'Conner 25'; O'Shea 53'	Stadium: Marconi Stadium; Attendance: 2,243; Referee: Bill Jones

12 June 1977 11	Eastern Suburbs	2–1	Canberra City	Sydney
	Smith 10'; Stevenson 28'	Report	J. Stoddart 15'	Stadium: Wentworth Park; Attendance: 1,239; Referee: Peter Rampley

26 June 1977 13	Mooroolbark	3–2	Canberra City	Melbourne
	McGregor 40'; Tront 62'; Lowrey 77'	Report	Bourke 50'; Henderson 62'	Stadium: Esther Park; Attendance: 550; Referee: Chris Bambridge

2 July 1977 14	Canberra City	1–2	Brisbane Lions	Sydney
	Stark 42'	Report	Morris 37' (pen.), 60'	Stadium: Wentworth Park; Attendance: 1,800; Referee: Peter Rampley

9 July 1977 15	West Adelaide	0–0	Canberra City	Adelaide
		Report		Stadium: Olympic Sports Field; Attendance: 2,500; Referee: Dennis Stanley

15 July 1977 12	Canberra City	0–2	South Melbourne	Sydney
		Report	Pye 42'; Kalifatidis 86'	Stadium: Wentworth Park; Attendance: 1,500

17 July 1977 16	Western Suburbs	3–1	Canberra City	Sydney
15:00 AEST	Eaton 2', 59'; Curran 86'	Report	Kawaleva 31'	Stadium: Englefield Stadium; Attendance: 1,012; Referee: Bill Jones

23 July 1977 17	Canberra City	1–1	Adelaide City	Canberra
	Grujicic 23'	Report	Deans 75'	Stadium: Manuka Oval; Attendance: 1,700; Referee: Brian Fowler

30 July 1977 18	Canberra City	4–0	Sydney Olympic	Canberra
	Grujicic 3'; Henderson 35'; Alston 81'; McIntosh 85' (o.g.)	Report		Stadium: Manuka Oval; Attendance: 1,500; Referee: Henry Witschge

7 August 1977 19	Fitzroy United	2–0	Canberra City	Melbourne
	Campbell 4'; Cole 7'	Report		Stadium: Olympic Park; Attendance: 2,500; Referee: Chris Bambridge

13 August 1977 20	Canberra City	0–1	Footscray JUST	Melbourne
		Report	Ristovski 11'	Stadium: Olympic Park; Attendance: 1,200; Referee: John Tattersall

21 August 1977 21	Brisbane City	0–1	Canberra City	Brisbane
		Report	Alston 87'	Stadium: Perry Park; Attendance: 4,328; Referee: Dieter Klose

31 August 1977 22	Canberra City	1–0	Marconi Fairfield	Queanbeyan
	Bourke 35'	Report		Stadium: Seiffert Oval; Attendance: 1,800; Referee: David Yelland

4 September 1977 23	St George-Budapest	2–0	Canberra City	Sydney
	O'Conner 17'; Hensman 40'	Report		Stadium: Wentworth Park; Attendance: 2,205; Referee: Peter Rampley

10 September 1977 24	Canberra City	0–0	Eastern Suburbs	Canberra
		Report		Stadium: Manuka Oval; Attendance: 1,600; Referee: Tony Beazleigh

18 September 1977 25	South Melbourne	1–1	Canberra City	Melbourne
	Cummings 30'	Report	Alston 78'	Stadium: Middle Park; Attendance: 2,000; Referee: Jim Dixon

24 September 1977 26	Canberra City	1–4	Mooroolbark	Melbourne
	Moulis 4'	Report	Lowrey 15', 71'; McGregor 47'; P. Ontong 58'	Stadium: Middle Park; Attendance: 1,200; Referee: Ken Allan

=== NSL Cup ===
Win Draw Loss

21 September 1977 First round	Canberra City	2–1	St George-Budapest	Canberra
	Alston 2'; Bourke 81'	Report	Jankovics 90+1'	Stadium: Manuka Oval; Attendance: 1,000; Referee: Dennis McDermott

3 October 1977 Quarter-finals	Marconi Fairfield	5–1	Canberra City	Sydney
	Mariani 25'; Rooney 44'; Sharne 58'; Byrne 75'; Campbell 87'	Report	Henderson 41'	Stadium: Sydney Sports Ground; Attendance: 1,190; Referee: Bill Jones

== Statistics ==
=== Appearances and goals ===
Includes all competitions. Players with no appearances not included in the list.

No.	Pos.	Nat.	Player	National Soccer League		NSL Cup		Total	
No.	Pos.	Nat.	Player	Apps	Goals	Apps	Goals	Apps	Goals
1	GK	(England)	Ron Tilsed	17	0	2	0	19	0
2	DF	(Australia)	Danny Moulis	25	1	2	0	27	1
3	DF	(Scotland)	John Brown	26	0	2	0	28	0
4	DF	(Australia)	Tony Henderson	25	4	2	1	27	5
5	—	(Australia)	Nick Boskov	21	0	1	0	22	0
8	MF	(Socialist Federal Republic of Yugoslavia)	Ivan Grujicic	25	4	2	0	27	4
9	FW	(Australia)	Brian Stoddart	22+1	2	0+1	0	24	2
10	FW	(Australia)	Adrian Alston	10	3	2	1	12	4
11	—	(Australia)	Michael Black	7+3	0	1+1	0	12	0
12	MF	(Australia)	Alan Bourke	14	2	2	1	16	3
14	MF	(Australia)	Jimmy Cant	20	0	2	0	22	0
15	DF	(Fiji)	Keni Kawaleva	8+4	1	1	0	13	1
16	DF	(Australia)	Steve Hogg	13+5	0	2	0	20	0
17	MF	(Argentina)	Vic Fernandez	4	0	2	0	6	0
18	DF	(England)	Roy Stark	18	1	0	0	18	1
19	FW	(England)	Dave O'Connor	6+4	1	0	0	10	1
—	MF	(Australia)	John Davies	2	0	0	0	2	0
—	GK	(Australia)	Malcolm Haynes	9	0	0	0	9	0
—	DF	(Australia)	Steve Kojsza	1	0	0	0	1	0
—	—	(Australia)	Oscar Langone	2	0	0	0	2	0
—	—	(Argentina)	Luis Salgado	2	0	0	0	2	0
—	MF	(Scotland)	John Stoddart	9	2	0	0	9	2
—	—	(Australia)	Greg Willet	0+3	0	0	0	3	0

=== Disciplinary record ===
Includes all competitions. The list is sorted by squad number when total cards are equal. Players with no cards not included in the list.

Rank	No.	Pos.	Nat.	Player	National Soccer League			NSL Cup			Total		
Rank	No.	Pos.	Nat.	Player	Yellow card	Second yellow card	Red card	Yellow card	Second yellow card	Red card	Yellow card	Second yellow card	Red card
1	9	FW	(Australia)	Brian Stoddart	3	0	1	0	0	0	3	0	1
2	8	MF	(Socialist Federal Republic of Yugoslavia)	Ivan Grujicic	1	0	1	0	0	0	1	0	1
2	—	MF	(Australia)	John Stoddart	1	0	1	0	0	0	1	0	1
4	14	FW	(Australia)	Jimmy Cant	4	0	0	1	0	0	5	0	0
5	4	DF	(Australia)	Tony Henderson	3	0	0	1	0	0	4	0	0
6	5	—	(Australia)	Nick Boskov	3	0	0	0	0	0	3	0	0
6	10	FW	(Australia)	Adrian Alston	2	0	0	1	0	0	3	0	0
8	3	DF	(Scotland)	John Brown	2	0	0	0	0	0	2	0	0
9	1	GK	(England)	Ron Tilsed	1	0	0	0	0	0	1	0	0
9	—	DF	(Australia)	Steve Kojsza	1	0	0	0	0	0	1	0	0
9	—	—	(Australia)	Oscar Langone	1	0	0	0	0	0	1	0	0
Total					22	0	3	3	0	0	25	0	3

=== Clean sheets ===
Includes all competitions. The list is sorted by squad number when total clean sheets are equal. Numbers in parentheses represent games where both goalkeepers participated and both kept a clean sheet; the number in parentheses is awarded to the goalkeeper who was substituted on, whilst a full clean sheet is awarded to the goalkeeper who was on the field at the start of play. Goalkeepers with no clean sheets not included in the list.

Rank	No.	Nat.	Goalkeeper	NSL	NSL Cup	Total
1	1	(England)	Ron Tilsed	5	0	5
2	—	(Australia)	Malcolm Haynes	3	0	3
Total				8	0	8
