= 1978 Canberra City FC season =

Canberra City
1978 season
- Head Coach: Johnny Warren
- Stadium: Bruce Stadium; Seiffert Oval
- National Soccer League: 13th
- NSL Cup: Semi-finals
- Top goalscorer: League: Terry Byrne; Ivan Grujicic (9 each); All: Terry Byrne; Ivan Grujicic (10 each)
- Highest home attendance: 7,450 vs. Marconi Fairfield (6 May 1978); National Soccer League
- Lowest home attendance: 2,600 vs. Fitzroy United (24 September 1978); NSL Cup
- Average home league attendance: 4,815
- Biggest win: 4–0 vs. West Woden Juventus (H) (10 May 1978); NSL Cup; 4–0 vs. Brisbane City (H) (29 July 1978); National Soccer League
- Biggest defeat: 0–3 vs. Eastern Suburbs (A) (14 May 1978); National Soccer League; 0–3 vs. Newcastle KB United (A) (1 July 1978); National Soccer League; 0–3 vs. South Melbourne (A) (26 August 1978); National Soccer League

The 1978 season was the second in the history of Canberra City Football Club. In addition to the domestic league, they also participated in the NSL Cup.

== Players ==
Note: Flags indicate national team as defined under FIFA eligibility rules; some limited exceptions apply. Players may hold more than one non-FIFA nationality.

No.	Pos.	Nation	Player
1	GK	ENG	Ron Tilsed
2	DF	AUS	Danny Moulis
3	DF	AUS	Milan Milovanovic
4	DF	AUS	Tony Henderson
5		ARG	Luis Salgado
6	MF	AUS	John Davies
7	DF	AUS	Steve Hogg
8	MF	YUG	Ivan Grujicic
9	DF	AUS	Terry Byrne
10		AUS	Brian Stoddart
11	DF	SCO	John Brown

No.	Pos.	Nation	Player
12	FW	AUS	Alan Reis
13	MF	ENG	Ian Heywood
14	MF	AUS	Jimmy Cant
15	FW	AUS	Bernard Lustica
16		AUS	Garry Parker
17	DF	FIJ	Keni Kawaleva
18	DF	ENG	Roy Stark
20	GK	AUS	David Lindenmayer
—		AUS	Ken Henderson
—	FW	SCO	Peter Marinello

== Competitions ==
=== Overall record ===
Competition	First match	Last match	Starting round	Final position	Record							
Competition	First match	Last match	Starting round	Final position	Pld	W	D	L	GF	GA	GD	Win %
National Soccer League	5 March 1978	26 August 1978	Matchday 1	13th	26	5	10	11	28	41	−13	19.23
NSL Cup	10 May 1978	1 October 1978	First round	Semi-finals	4	2	1	1	9	6	+3	50.00
Total					30	7	11	12	37	47	−10	23.33

Source: Competitions

=== National Soccer League ===
==== League table ====
Pos	Team	Pld	W	D	L	GF	GA	GD	Pts
10	Adelaide City	26	9	6	11	38	44	−6	24
11	Newcastle KB United	26	6	10	10	33	40	−7	22
12	Footscray JUST	26	7	8	11	29	37	−8	22
13	Canberra City	26	5	10	11	28	41	−13	20
14	Brisbane City	26	7	3	16	29	49	−20	17

Source: rsssf.com
Rules for classification: 1) Points; 2) Goal difference; 3) Goals scored

==== Results summary ====
Overall								Home						Away					
Pld	W	D	L	GF	GA	GD	Pts	W	D	L	GF	GA	GD	W	D	L	GF	GA	GD
26	5	10	11	28	41	−13	25	2	8	3	19	20	−1	3	2	8	9	21	−12

Source: worldfootball.net

==== Results by round ====
Round	1	2	4	3	5	6	7	8	9	10	11	12	13	14	15	16	17	18	19	20	21	22	23	24	25	26
Ground	H	H	A	A	H	A	H	H	A	H	A	H	A	A	A	H	H	A	H	A	A	H	A	H	A	H
Result	D	D	W	L	D	D	D	D	L	D	L	D	D	L	L	D	L	L	W	W	W	W	L	L	L	L
Position	7	7	7	9	6	6	6	5	8	9	13	11	9	12	12	12	14	14	14	12	10	9	11	11	13	13
Points	1	2	4	4	5	6	7	8	8	9	9	10	11	11	11	12	12	12	14	16	18	20	20	20	20	20

Source: worldfootball.net
A = Away; H = Home; W = Win; D = Draw; L = Loss

==== Matches ====
Win Draw Loss

5 March 1978 1	Canberra City	1–1	West Adelaide	Canberra
	Grujicic 82' (pen.)	Report	Norris 68'	Stadium: Bruce Stadium; Attendance: 6,000; Referee: Ken Allen

12 March 1978 2	Canberra City	2–2	Adelaide City	Canberra
	Byrne 47'; Grujicic 62'	Report	J. Nyskohus 22'; Melta 36'	Stadium: Bruce Stadium; Attendance: 6,580; Referee: Barry Wilkinson

26 March 1978 4	Sydney Olympic	1–2	Canberra City	Sydney
	Senkalski 19' (pen.)	Report	Grujicic 9' (pen.); Byrne 17'	Stadium: Erskineville Oval; Attendance: 4,133; Referee: Alf Rodway

27 March 1978 3	St George-Budapest	2–1	Canberra City	Sydney
	O'Connor 43'; Hensman 61'	Report	Heywood 22'	Stadium: St George Stadium; Attendance: 2,533; Referee: Peter Rampley

1 April 1978 5	Canberra City	2–2	Newcastle KB United	Canberra
	Byrne 67'; Stoddart 73'	Report	Mason 33'; Drinkwater 39'	Stadium: Bruce Stadium; Attendance: 3,200; Referee: Des Miles

9 April 1978 6	Brisbane Lions	2–2	Canberra City	Brisbane
	Paszlo 13'; Hermiston 40' (pen.)	Report	Cant 9'; Hermiston 15' (o.g.)	Stadium: Perry Park; Attendance: 3,000; Referee: Jack Wood

15 April 1978 7	Canberra City	2–2	Fitzroy United	Canberra
	Byrne 54'; Grujicic 65' (pen.)	Report	Cole 60'; Taylor 85' (pen.)	Stadium: Bruce Stadium; Attendance: 5,300; Referee: Brian Fowler

22 April 1978 8	Canberra City	1–1	Footscray JUST	Canberra
	Stark 72'	Report	Picioane 29'	Stadium: Bruce Stadium; Attendance: 5,020; Referee: Tim Davies

30 April 1978 9	Brisbane City	1–0	Canberra City	Brisbane
	Caldwell 43'	Report		Stadium: Perry Park; Attendance: 4,100; Referee: Dieter Klose

6 May 1978 10	Canberra City	0–0	Marconi Fairfield	Canberra
		Report		Stadium: Bruce Stadium; Attendance: 7,450; Referee: Henry Witschge

14 May 1978 11	Eastern Suburbs	3–0	Canberra City	Sydney
	O'Connor 66'; Campbell 72'; Souness 89'	Report		Stadium: Wentworth Park; Attendance: 2,685; Referee: Peter Rampley

20 May 1978 12	Canberra City	2–2	Western Suburbs	Canberra
	Grujicic 64', 82' (pen.)	Report	Fisher 22'; O'Donnell 90+1'	Stadium: Bruce Stadium; Attendance: 5,000; Referee: David Yelland

27 May 1978 13	South Melbourne	0–0	Canberra City	Melbourne
		Report		Stadium: Middle Park Soccer Stadium; Attendance: 3,500; Referee: Tony Beazleigh

4 June 1978 14	Adelaide City	3–1	Canberra City	Adelaide
	Marocchi 1', 72'; Muir 70'	Report	Grujicic 31'	Stadium: Olympic Sports Field; Attendance: 5,301; Referee: Don Campbell

11 June 1978 15	West Adelaide	2–0	Canberra City	Adelaide
	McGregor 28'; Norris 90'	Report		Stadium: Hindmarsh Stadium; Attendance: 4,321; Referee: Bobby Kerr

17 June 1978 16	Canberra City	1–1	St George-Budapest	Canberra
	Grujicic 29' (pen.)	Report	Coates 33'	Stadium: Bruce Stadium; Attendance: 4,500; Referee: Tony Beazleigh

24 June 1978 17	Canberra City	1–3	Sydney Olympic	Canberra
	Byrne 85'	Report	Pirie 7', 63'; D. Allan 70'	Stadium: Bruce Stadium; Attendance: 4,300; Referee: Doug Rennie

1 July 1978 18	Newcastle KB United	3–0	Canberra City	Newcastle
	Boden 2', 47' (pen.); Curran 82'	Report		Stadium: Newcastle International Sports Centre; Attendance: 9,057; Referee: Barry Wilkinson

8 July 1978 19	Canberra City	2–1	Brisbane Lions	Canberra
	Bennett 42' (o.g.); Burne 82'	Report	Neale 6'	Stadium: Bruce Stadium; Attendance: 3,520; Referee: Richard Lorenc

16 July 1978 20	Fitzroy United	0–1	Canberra City	Melbourne
		Report	Marinello 85'	Stadium: Olympic Park; Attendance: 4,000; Referee: Nick Karlich

23 July 1978 21	Footscray JUST	1–2	Canberra City	Melbourne
	Palinkas 4'	Report	Byrne 36', 68'	Stadium: Schintler Reserve; Attendance: 1,000; Referee: Chris Bambridge

29 July 1978 22	Canberra City	4–0	Brisbane City	Canberra
	Byrne 57'; Henderson 69'; Stoddart 84'; Grujicic 84'	Report		Stadium: Bruce Stadium; Attendance: 4,211; Referee: David Yelland

6 August 1978 23	Marconi Fairfield	2–0	Canberra City	Sydney
	Mariani 50'; Jankoivcs 90'	Report		Stadium: Marconi Oval; Attendance: 4,519; Referee: Richard Lorenc

12 August 1978 24	Canberra City	1–2	Eastern Suburbs	Canberra
	Heywood 34'	Report	Thomson 16'; Smith 23'	Stadium: Bruce Stadium; Attendance: 3,311; Referee: Dave Nugent

20 August 1978 25	Western Suburbs	1–0	Canberra City	Sydney
	Stone 80'	Report		Stadium: Wentworth Park; Attendance: 2,747; Referee: Barry Wilkinson

26 August 1978 26	Canberra City	0–3	South Melbourne	Canberra
		Report	Lutton 2'; Cummings 58', 75'	Stadium: Bruce Stadium; Attendance: 4,200; Referee: Tony Boskovic

=== NSL Cup ===
Win Draw Loss

10 May 1978 First round	Canberra City	4–0	West Woden Juventus	Queanbeyan
	Henderson 51', 57', ?'; Grujicic ?'	Report		Stadium: Seiffert Oval; Attendance:

2 August 1978 Second round	Sunshine George Cross	2–3	Canberra City	Queanbeyan
	Paparas 26'; Reed 65'	Report	Davies 42'; Byrne 62'; Grujicic 80'	Stadium: Seiffert Oval; Attendance: 8,000; Referee: Chris Bambridge

24 September 1978 Quarter-finals	Canberra City	1–1 (a.e.t.) (5–4 p)	Fitzroy United	Canberra
	Cant 45'	Report	Cole 30'	Stadium: Bruce Stadium; Attendance: 2,600; Referee: Peter Rampley

1 October 1978 Semi-finals	Adelaide City	3–1	Canberra City	Adelaide
	Marwe 8'; Muniz 52', 89'	Report	Stoddart 4'	Stadium: Olympic Sports Field; Attendance: 2,651; Referee: Tim Davies

== Statistics ==
=== Appearances and goals ===
Includes all competitions. Players with no appearances not included in the list.

No.	Pos.	Nat.	Player	National Soccer League		NSL Cup		Total	
No.	Pos.	Nat.	Player	Apps	Goals	Apps	Goals	Apps	Goals
1	GK	(England)	Ron Tilsed	24	0	3	0	27	0
2	DF	(Australia)	Danny Moulis	17+1	0	1	0	19	0
3	DF	(Australia)	Milan Milovanovic	15+2	0	1	0	18	0
4	DF	(Australia)	Tony Henderson	26	1	3	0	29	1
5	—	(Argentina)	Luis Selgado	2+1	0	2	0	5	0
6	MF	(Australia)	John Davies	17+1	0	3	1	21	1
7	DF	(Australia)	Steve Hogg	15+2	0	1	0	18	0
8	MF	(Socialist Federal Republic of Yugoslavia)	Ivan Grujicic	19+3	9	2+1	1	25	10
9	DF	(Australia)	Terry Byrne	23	9	3	1	26	10
10	—	(Australia)	Brian Stoddart	17	2	3	0	20	2
11	DF	(Scotland)	John Brown	19	0	1+1	0	21	0
12	FW	(Australia)	Alan Reis	0+1	0	0	0	1	0
13	MF	(England)	Ian Heywood	17+5	2	3	0	25	2
14	MF	(Australia)	Jimmy Cant	23	1	3	1	26	2
15	FW	(Australia)	Bernard Lustica	0+3	0	0	0	3	0
16	—	(Australia)	Garry Parker	9	0	0	0	9	0
17	DF	(Fiji)	Keni Kawaleva	5+1	0	2	0	8	0
18	DF	(England)	Roy Stark	25	1	2	0	27	1
20	GK	(Australia)	David Lindenmayer	2	0	0	0	2	0
—	—	(Australia)	Ken Henderson	0+2	0	0	0	2	0
—	FW	(Scotland)	Peter Marinello	11	1	0	0	11	1

=== Disciplinary record ===
Includes all competitions. The list is sorted by squad number when total cards are equal. Players with no cards not included in the list.

Rank	No.	Pos.	Nat.	Player	National Soccer League			NSL Cup			Total		
Rank	No.	Pos.	Nat.	Player	Yellow card	Second yellow card	Red card	Yellow card	Second yellow card	Red card	Yellow card	Second yellow card	Red card
1	9	DF	(Australia)	Terry Byrne	4	0	1	0	0	0	4	0	1
1	14	MF	(Australia)	Jimmy Cant	4	0	1	0	0	0	4	0	1
3	10	—	(Australia)	Brian Stoddart	4	0	0	0	0	0	4	0	0
4	4	DF	(Australia)	Tony Henderson	3	0	0	0	0	0	3	0	0
5	1	GK	(England)	Ron Tilsed	2	0	0	0	0	0	2	0	0
5	11	DF	(Scotland)	John Brown	2	0	0	0	0	0	2	0	0
7	2	DF	(Australia)	Danny Moulis	1	0	0	0	0	0	1	0	0
7	6	MF	(Australia)	John Davies	1	0	0	0	0	0	1	0	0
7	8	MF	(Socialist Federal Republic of Yugoslavia)	Ivan Grujicic	1	0	0	0	0	0	1	0	0
7	13	MF	(England)	Ian Heywood	1	0	0	0	0	0	1	0	0
7	16	—	(Australia)	Garry Parker	1	0	0	0	0	0	1	0	0
7	17	DF	(Fiji)	Keni Kawaleva	1	0	0	0	0	0	1	0	0
Total					24	0	2	1	0	0	25	0	2

=== Clean sheets ===
Includes all competitions. The list is sorted by squad number when total clean sheets are equal. Numbers in parentheses represent games where both goalkeepers participated and both kept a clean sheet; the number in parentheses is awarded to the goalkeeper who was substituted on, whilst a full clean sheet is awarded to the goalkeeper who was on the field at the start of play. Goalkeepers with no clean sheets not included in the list.

Rank	No.	Nat.	Goalkeeper	NSL	NSL Cup	Total
1	1	(England)	Ron Tilsed	4	0	4
Total				4	0	4
