= 1980 Footscray JUST season =

Footscray JUST
1980 season
- Head Coach: Rocco Ille; Bobby McLachlan; Jim Kriaris
- Stadium: Middle Park Soccer Stadium; Western Oval; Olympic Park
- National Soccer League: 9th
- NSL Cup: First round
- Top goalscorer: League: Dragan Vasic (7); All: Dragan Vasic (7)
- Highest home attendance: 6,734 vs. Heidelberg United (17 August 1980); National Soccer League
- Lowest home attendance: 800 vs. Canberra City (28 June 1980); National Soccer League
- Average home league attendance: 2,613
- Biggest win: 3–0 vs. South Melbourne (H) (4 May 1980); National Soccer League; 3–0 vs. Blacktown City (H) (21 September 1980); National Soccer League
- Biggest defeat: 0–4 vs. Marconi Fairfield (H) (27 July 1980); National Soccer League

The 1980 season was the fourth in the National Soccer League for Footscray JUST. In addition to the domestic league, they also participated in the NSL Cup. Footscray JUST finished 9th in their National Soccer League season, and were eliminated in the first round of the NSL Cup.

== Players ==
Note: Flags indicate national team as defined under FIFA eligibility rules; some limited exceptions apply. Players may hold more than one non-FIFA nationality.

No.	Pos.	Nation	Player
1	GK	SCO	Dennis Boland
2	DF	YUG	Igor Hazabent
3	DF	AUS	Chris Petrov
4	DF	SCO	Jim O'Reilly
5	DF	GRE	Jim Kondarios (captain)
6	MF	YUG	Slobodan Jovanovic
7	FW	YUG	Dragan Vasic
8	MF	AUS	Zoran Ilioski
9	MF	AUS	Josip Picioane
10	FW	AUS	Peter Ollerton

No.	Pos.	Nation	Player
11	MF	YUG	Zdravko Lujic
12	MF	YUG	Mirko Rujevic
14	MF	AUS	Vlatko Belic
16	FW	AUS	Paul Simic
20	GK	AUS	Steve Potter
—	FW	AUS	Bruno Cozzella
—	DF	AUS	Jim Kriaris
—	DF	AUS	Kyri Kyriakouleas
—	DF	AUS	Jim Milne

== Competitions ==
=== Overall record ===
Competition	First match	Last match	Starting round	Final position	Record							
Competition	First match	Last match	Starting round	Final position	Pld	W	D	L	GF	GA	GD	Win %
National Soccer League	9 March 1980	28 September 1980	Matchday 1	9th	26	7	9	10	32	41	−9	26.92
NSL Cup	25 April 1980		First round	First round	1	0	1	0	2	2	+0	0.00
Total					27	7	10	10	34	43	−9	25.93

Source: Competitions

=== National Soccer League ===
==== League table ====
Pos	Team	Pld	W	D	L	GF	GA	GD	Pts	Qualification or relegation
1	Sydney City (C)	26	16	5	5	51	26	+25	37	Qualification to Finals series (Note: The Finals series was not considered the championship for the 1980 National Soccer League.)
2	Heidelberg United	26	15	6	5	55	33	+22	36	Qualification to Finals series
3	South Melbourne	26	15	5	6	42	21	+21	35	Qualification to Finals series
4	Marconi Fairfield	26	14	6	6	53	32	+21	34	Qualification to Finals series
5	Adelaide City	26	13	4	9	40	27	+13	30	
6	Newcastle KB United	26	12	6	8	32	31	+1	30	
7	Brisbane Lions	26	7	11	8	28	32	−4	25	
8	APIA Leichhardt	26	8	7	11	27	35	−8	23	
9	Footscray JUST	26	7	9	10	32	41	−9	23	
10	Canberra City	26	7	7	12	34	33	+1	21	
11	Blacktown City	26	9	3	14	34	55	−21	21	
12	Brisbane City	26	4	10	12	29	36	−7	18	
13	West Adelaide	26	7	3	16	24	46	−22	17	
14	St George-Budapest (R)	26	5	4	17	32	65	−33	14	Relegated to the 1981 NSW State League

Updated to match(es) played on unknown. Source: rsssf.com
Rules for classification: 1) points; 2) goal difference; 3) number of goals scored.
(C) Champions; (R) Relegated

==== Results summary ====
Overall								Home						Away					
Pld	W	D	L	GF	GA	GD	Pts	W	D	L	GF	GA	GD	W	D	L	GF	GA	GD
26	7	9	10	32	41	−9	30	6	1	6	20	21	−1	1	8	4	12	20	−8

Source: worldfootball.net

==== Results by round ====
Round	1	3	4	5	6	7	8	9	10	11	12	14	15	16	2	17	18	19	13	20	21	22	23	24	25	26
Ground	A	H	A	H	A	H	A	H	A	H	A	A	H	H	H	A	A	H	H	A	H	A	H	A	H	A
Result	D	W	L	W	D	W	L	W	W	L	L	D	D	L	L	D	D	L	W	D	L	L	L	D	W	D
Position	5	6	11	7	8	7	7	7	7	7	7	6	7	8	11	8	8	9	6	8	9	9	10	10	9	9
Points	1	3	3	5	6	8	8	10	12	12	12	13	14	14	14	15	16	16	18	19	19	19	19	20	22	22

Source: worldfootball.net
A = Away; H = Home; W = Win; D = Draw; L = Loss

==== Matches ====
Win Draw Loss

9 March 1980 1	Brisbane City	1–1	Footscray JUST	Brisbane
	Caldwell 79' (pen.)	Report	Caldwell 11' (o.g.)	Stadium: Perry Park; Attendance: 3,150; Referee: Peter Rampley

22 March 1980 3	Footscray JUST	3–1	Brisbane Lions	Melbourne
	Picioane 10'; Belic 15'; Vasic 65'	Report	Lindsay 8'	Stadium: Middle Park Soccer Stadium; Attendance: 2,210; Referee: Stewart Mellings

30 March 1980 4	Adelaide City	4–1	Footscray JUST	Adelaide
	Deans 21'; J. Nyskohus 52' (pen.), 68'; Northcote 88'	Report	Kondarios 18'	Stadium: Olympic Sports Field; Attendance: 3,300; Referee: Dennis Stanley

6 April 1980 5	Footscray JUST	5–3	St George-Budapest	Melbourne
	Jovanovic 15'; Lujic 26'; Kondarios 50'; Vasic 76'; Ollerton 86'	Report	Kay 47'; Duarte 64', 78'	Stadium: Western Oval; Attendance: 3,540; Referee: Evan Venios

13 April 1980 6	Marconi Fairfield	2–2	Footscray JUST	Sydney
	Raskopoulos 13'; Krncevic 33'	Report	Hazabent 16'; Picioane 63'	Stadium: Marconi Oval; Attendance: 5,666; Referee: Doug Rennie

20 April 1980 7	Footscray JUST	2–1	Newcastle KB United	Melbourne
	Lujic 35'; Vasic 80'	Report	Trenter 29'	Stadium: Western Oval; Attendance: 4,015; Referee: Chris Bambridge

27 April 1980 8	Heidelberg United	3–2	Footscray JUST	Melbourne
15:00 AEST	Paton 12'; Cole 52', 64'	Report	Lujic 47'; Picioane 84'	Stadium: Olympic Park; Attendance: 4,800; Referee: Ken Allen

4 May 1980 9	Footscray JUST	3–0	South Melbourne	Melbourne
	Petrov 1'; Vasic 10'; Ollerton 84' (pen.)	Report		Stadium: Olympic Park; Attendance: 6,500; Referee: Peter Rampley

11 May 1980 10	West Adelaide	0–2	Footscray JUST	Adelaide
		Report	Vasic 56'; Hazabent 78'	Stadium: Hindmarsh Stadium; Attendance: 2,450; Referee: Don Campbell

18 May 1980 11	Footscray JUST	1–2	Sydney City	Melbourne
	Ollerton 66'	Report	Barnes 65'; Stevenson 75'	Stadium: Olympic Park; Attendance: 2,557; Referee: Jack Johnston

25 May 1980 12	Blacktown City	3–0	Footscray JUST	Sydney
	Hunter 49', 66'; O'Reilly 82' (o.g.)	Report		Stadium: Gabbie Stadium; Attendance: 3,568; Referee: Henry Witschge

8 June 1980 14	Canberra City	0–0	Footscray JUST	Canberra
15:00 AEST		Report		Stadium: Bruce Stadium; Attendance: 3,300; Referee: Bob Mee

14 June 1980 15	Footscray JUST	1–1	Brisbane City	Melbourne
	Ilioski 3'	Report	McCluskey 52'	Stadium: Middle Park Soccer Stadium; Attendance: 1,000; Referee: Evan Venios

22 June 1980 16	Footscray JUST	1–3	Adelaide City	Melbourne
	Vasic (6))	Report	J. Nyskohus 14' (pen.); Barnes 28'; Fashanu 80'	Stadium: Olympic Park; Attendance: 1,916; Referee: Chris Bambridge

28 June 1980 2	Footscray JUST	0–1	Canberra City	Melbourne
		Report	Byrne 25'	Stadium: Middle Park Soccer Stadium; Attendance: 800; Referee: Tony Beazleigh

13 July 1980 17	Brisbane Lions	1–1	Footscray JUST	Brisbane
	Hogg 14'	Report	Cozzella 49'	Stadium: Lions Stadium; Attendance: 2,500; Referee: Doug Rennie

20 July 1980 18	St George-Budapest	1–1	Footscray JUST	Sydney
	Katholos 48' (pen.)	Report	Vasic 66'	Stadium: St George Stadium; Attendance: 2,174; Referee: Jim Reeves

27 July 1980 19	Footscray JUST	0–4	Marconi Fairfield	Melbourne
		Report	Sharne 16', 32'; Byrne 21'; Jankovics 24'	Stadium: Middle Park Soccer Stadium; Attendance: 1,000; Referee: Bobby Kerr

3 August 1980 13	Footscray JUST	1–0	APIA Leichhardt	Melbourne
	Ilioski 22'	Report		Stadium: Olympic Park; Attendance: 1,000; Referee: Tony Beazleigh

9 August 1980 20	Newcastle KB United	0–0	Footscray JUST	Newcastle
		Report		Stadium: Newcastle International Sports Centre; Attendance: 5,526; Referee: Tony Boskovic

17 August 1980 21	Footscray JUST	0–2	Heidelberg United	Melbourne
		Report	Paton 32'; Bozikas 56'	Stadium: Western Oval; Attendance: 6,734; Referee: Chris Bambridge

31 August 1980 22	South Melbourne	3–0	Footscray JUST	Melbourne
	Evans 14', 51'; Wright 34'	Report		Stadium: Middle Park Soccer Stadium; Attendance: 3,500; Referee: Henry Witschge

7 September 1980 23	Footscray JUST	0–3	West Adelaide	Melbourne
		Report	Forde 16'; McGachey 59'; Kosmina 70'	Stadium: Western Oval; Attendance: 1,200; Referee: Dave Nugent

14 September 1980 24	Sydney City	2–2	Footscray JUST	Sydney
15:00 AEST	Trenter 16'; Spanos 90+4'	Report	Lujic 60', 87'	Stadium: ES Marks Athletics Field; Attendance: 1,500; Referee: Doug Rennie

21 September 1980 25	Footscray JUST	3–0	Blacktown City	Melbourne
	Ilioski 25'; Belic 72'; Picioane 76'	Report		Stadium: Western Oval; Attendance: 1,500; Referee: Don Campbell

28 September 1980 26	APIA Leichhardt	0–0	Footscray JUST	Sydney
		Report		Stadium: Lambert Park; Attendance: 3,519; Referee: Evan Venios

=== NSL Cup ===
Win Draw Loss

25 April 1980 First round	Footscray JUST	2–2 (a.e.t.) (4–5 p)	(Victoria (state)) Green Gully	Melbourne
	Lujic 26'; Ollerton 99' (pen.)	Report	Morrey 19'; Belic 118' (o.g.)	Stadium: Middle Park Soccer Stadium; Attendance: 3,000; Referee: Evan Venios

== Statistics ==
=== Appearances and goals ===
Includes all competitions. Players with no appearances not included in the list.

No.	Pos.	Nat.	Player	National Soccer League		NSL Cup		Total	
No.	Pos.	Nat.	Player	Apps	Goals	Apps	Goals	Apps	Goals
1	GK	(Scotland)	Dennis Boland	24	0	0	0	24	0
2	DF	(Socialist Federal Republic of Yugoslavia)	Igor Hazabent	19+1	2	1	0	21	2
3	DF	(Australia)	Chris Petrov	20+5	1	1	0	26	1
4	DF	(Scotland)	Jim O'Reilly	22	0	1	0	23	0
5	DF	(Greece)	Jim Kondarios	20+1	2	0	0	21	2
6	MF	(Socialist Federal Republic of Yugoslavia)	Slobodan Jovanovic	19+2	1	1	0	22	1
7	FW	(Socialist Federal Republic of Yugoslavia)	Dragan Vasic	23+3	7	1	0	27	7
8	MF	(Australia)	Zoran Ilioski	22+4	3	0+1	0	27	3
9	MF	(Australia)	Josip Picioane	20	4	1	0	21	4
10	FW	(Australia)	Peter Ollerton	12	3	1	1	13	4
11	MF	(Socialist Federal Republic of Yugoslavia)	Zdravko Lujic	26	5	1	1	27	6
12	MF	(Socialist Federal Republic of Yugoslavia)	Mirko Rujevic	18	0	1	0	19	0
14	MF	(Australia)	Vlatko Belic	16+5	2	1	0	22	2
16	FW	(Australia)	Paul Simic	1+6	0	0+1	0	8	0
20	GK	(Australia)	Steve Potter	2+2	0	1	0	5	0
—	FW	(Australia)	Bruno Cozzella	1+5	1	0	0	6	1
—	DF	(Australia)	Jim Kriaris	5	0	0	0	5	0
—	DF	(Australia)	Kyri Kyriakouleas	13+1	0	0	0	14	0
—	DF	(Australia)	Jim Milne	3+1	0	0	0	4	0

=== Disciplinary record ===
Includes all competitions. The list is sorted by squad number when total cards are equal. Players with no cards not included in the list.

Rank	No.	Pos.	Nat.	Player	National Soccer League			NSL Cup			Total		
Rank	No.	Pos.	Nat.	Player	Yellow card	Second yellow card	Red card	Yellow card	Second yellow card	Red card	Yellow card	Second yellow card	Red card
1	1	GK	(Scotland)	Dennis Boland	2	0	1	0	0	0	2	0	1
2	2	DF	(Socialist Federal Republic of Yugoslavia)	Igor Hazabent	3	0	0	0	0	0	3	0	0
2	5	DF	(Greece)	Jim Kondarios	3	0	0	0	0	0	3	0	0
2	6	MF	(Socialist Federal Republic of Yugoslavia)	Slobodan Jovanovic	3	0	0	0	0	0	3	0	0
2	—	DF	(Australia)	Kyri Kyriakouleas	3	0	0	0	0	0	3	0	0
6	3	DF	(Australia)	Chris Petrov	2	0	0	0	0	0	2	0	0
6	4	DF	(Scotland)	Jim O'Reilly	2	0	0	0	0	0	2	0	0
6	9	MF	(Australia)	Josip Picioane	2	0	0	0	0	0	2	0	0
6	10	FW	(Australia)	Peter Ollerton	2	0	0	0	0	0	2	0	0
6	11	MF	(Australia)	Zdravko Lujic	2	0	0	0	0	0	2	0	0
6	12	MF	(Socialist Federal Republic of Yugoslavia)	Mirko Rujevic	2	0	0	0	0	0	2	0	0
6	14	MF	(Australia)	Vlatko Belic	2	0	0	0	0	0	2	0	0
13	7	FW	(Socialist Federal Republic of Yugoslavia)	Dragan Vasic	1	0	0	0	0	0	1	0	0
13	—	DF	(Australia)	Jim Milne	1	0	0	0	0	0	1	0	0
Total					30	0	1	0	0	0	30	0	1

=== Clean sheets ===
Includes all competitions. The list is sorted by squad number when total clean sheets are equal. Numbers in parentheses represent games where both goalkeepers participated and both kept a clean sheet; the number in parentheses is awarded to the goalkeeper who was substituted on, whilst a full clean sheet is awarded to the goalkeeper who was on the field at the start of play. Goalkeepers with no clean sheets not included in the list.

Rank	No.	Nat.	Goalkeeper	NSL	NSL Cup	Total
1	1	(Australia)	Dennis Boland	7	0	0
Total				7	0	7
