= 1979 Footscray JUST season =

Footscray JUST
1979 season
- Head Coach: Cedo Cirkovic; Milenko Rusmir; Bobby McLachlan
- Stadium: Bruce Stadium
- National Soccer League: 10th
- NSL Cup: Quarter-finals
- Top goalscorer: League: Joe Palinkas; Josip Picioane (7 each); All: Joe Palinkas (9)
- Highest home attendance: 7,050 vs. South Melbourne (6 May 1979); National Soccer League
- Lowest home attendance: 800 vs. Sydney City (22 July 1979); National Soccer League
- Average home league attendance: 2,498
- Biggest win: 5–1 vs. APIA Leichhardt (15 September 1979); National Soccer League
- Biggest defeat: 0–5 vs. Marconi Fairfield (15 April 1979); National Soccer League; 0–5 vs. West Adelaide (13 May 1979); National Soccer League

The 1979 season was the third in the National Soccer League for Footscray JUST. In addition to the domestic league, they also participated in the NSL Cup. Footscray JUST finished 10th in their National Soccer League season, and were eliminated in the quarter-finals of the NSL Cup.

== Players ==
Note: Flags indicate national team as defined under FIFA eligibility rules; some limited exceptions apply. Players may hold more than one non-FIFA nationality.

No.	Pos.	Nation	Player
1	GK	AUS	Steve Potter
2	MF	AUS	Zoran Ilioski
3	MF	YUG	Andrija Ristic
4		AUS	Radoslav Jovicic
5	DF	GRE	Jim Kondarios (captain)
6	MF	YUG	Slobodan Jovanovic
7	FW	HUN	Joe Palinkas
8	MF	YUG	Mirko Rujevic
9	MF	AUS	Josip Picioane

No.	Pos.	Nation	Player
10	FW	AUS	Peter Ollerton
11	MF	AUS	Vlatko Belic
12	MF	YUG	Zdravko Lujic
13		AUS	Zoran Todorovic
15	DF	YUG	Igor Hazabent
18	DF	SCO	Jim O'Reilly
20		AUS	Milutin Ciric
—		AUS	Steve Carpenter
—	FW	YUG	Dragan Vasic

== Competitions ==
=== Overall record ===
Competition	First match	Last match	Starting round	Final position	Record							
Competition	First match	Last match	Starting round	Final position	Pld	W	D	L	GF	GA	GD	Win %
National Soccer League	11 March 1979	23 September 1979	Matchday 1	10th	26	8	3	15	29	43	−14	30.77
NSL Cup	25 April 1979	27 May 1979	First round	Quarter-finals	3	2	0	1	5	5	+0	66.67
Total					29	10	3	16	34	48	−14	34.48

Source: Competitions

=== National Soccer League ===
==== League table ====
Pos	Team	Pld	W	D	L	GF	GA	GD	Pts	Qualification or relegation
1	Marconi Fairfield (C)	26	15	6	5	58	32	+26	40 (Note: A Bonus Point was awarded for victories of 4 goals or more.)	Qualification to Finals series (Note: The Finals series was not considered the championship for the 1979 National Soccer League.)
2	Heidelberg United	26	14	7	5	44	30	+14	36	Qualification to Finals series
3	Sydney City	26	15	3	8	47	29	+18	34	Qualification to Finals series
4	Brisbane City	26	14	5	7	38	30	+8	34	Qualification to Finals series
5	Adelaide City	26	13	6	7	43	27	+16	33	
6	Newcastle KB United	26	11	9	6	43	30	+13	32	
7	West Adelaide	26	10	4	12	28	31	−3	25	
8	APIA Leichhardt	26	11	3	12	29	37	−8	25	
9	Brisbane Lions	26	8	6	12	28	40	−12	22	
10	Footscray JUST	26	8	3	15	29	43	−14	20	
11	St George-Budapest	26	7	6	13	27	43	−16	20	
12	Canberra City	26	6	8	12	25	41	−16	20	
13	Sydney Olympic (R)	26	7	5	14	23	30	−7	19	Relegated to the 1980 NSW State League
14	South Melbourne	26	6	3	17	26	45	−19	16	

Updated to match(es) played on unknown. Source: rsssf.com
Rules for classification: 1) points; 2) goal difference; 3) number of goals scored.
(C) Champions; (R) Relegated

==== Results summary ====
Overall								Home						Away					
Pld	W	D	L	GF	GA	GD	Pts	W	D	L	GF	GA	GD	W	D	L	GF	GA	GD
26	8	3	15	29	43	−14	27	5	1	7	17	20	−3	3	2	8	12	23	−11

Source: worldfootball.net

==== Results by round ====
Round	1	2	3	4	5	6	7	8	9	10	11	12	13	15	16	17	18	19	20	14	21	22	23	24	25	26
Ground	A	H	A	H	A	H	A	H	H	A	H	A	H	H	A	H	H	A	H	A	A	A	H	A	H	A
Result	L	D	W	W	L	L	W	L	L	L	W	L	W	L	L	L	W	D	L	L	W	D	L	L	W	L
Position	9	11	6	4	9	11	8	10	11	12	11	12	10	10	11	12	12	11	11	12	12	12	12	12	10	10
Points	0	1	3	5	5	5	7	7	7	7	9	9	11	11	11	11	13	14	14	14	16	17	17	17	20	20

Source: worldfootball.net
A = Away; H = Home; W = Win; D = Draw; L = Loss

==== Matches ====
Win Draw Loss

11 March 1979 1	Sydney Olympic	2–0	Footscray JUST	Sydney
	McIntosh 36'; Eaton 75'	Report		Stadium: St George Stadium; Attendance: 2,426; Referee: Jim Reeves

18 March 1979 2	Footscray JUST	2–2	Heidelberg United	Melbourne
	Ristovski 12'; Picioane 26'	Report	Buljevic 30'; Cole 44' (pen.)	Stadium: Olympic Park; Attendance: 5,000; Referee: Jack Johnston

25 March 1979 3	Canberra City	0–3	Footscray JUST	Canberra
15:00 AEDT		Report	Picioane 50'; Palinkas 57'; Ristovski 66'	Stadium: Bruce Stadium; Attendance: 7,321; Referee: Stewart Mellings

1 April 1979 4	Footscray JUST	3–1	Brisbane Lions	Melbourne
	Kondarios 20'; Picioane 27', 37'	Report	Spearritt 89'	Stadium: Olympic Park No. 2 Attendance: 3,123; Referee: Chris Bambridge

8 April 1979 5	Sydney City	3–0	Footscray JUST	Sydney
	Watson 6'; Campbell 68'; Stevenson 80'	Report		Stadium: Wentworth Park; Attendance: 2,034; Referee: Ken Allen

15 April 1979 6	Footscray JUST	0–5	Marconi Fairfield	Melbourne
		Report	Jankovics 15', 30'; Henderson 41'; Sharne 45', 67'	Stadium: Olympic Park; Attendance: 5,200; Referee: Chris Bambridge

22 April 1979 7	St George-Budapest	0–2	Footscray JUST	Sydney
		Report	Ollerton 20'; Ristovski 87'	Stadium: St George Stadium; Attendance: 1,867; Referee: Tony Boskovic

29 April 1979 8	Footscray JUST	0–2	Adelaide City	Melbourne
		Report	Deans 5'; J. Nyskohus 89'	Stadium: Olympic Park; Attendance: 2,146; Referee: Stewart Mellings

6 May 1979 9	Footscray JUST	0–2	South Melbourne	Melbourne
15:00 AEST		Report	Lutton 14'; Wright 50'	Stadium: Olympic Park; Attendance: 7,050; Referee: Chris Bambridge

13 May 1979 10	West Adelaide	5–0	Footscray JUST	Adelaide
	Norris 49', 78'; Boyle 59'; Kosmina 60'; Jones 83'	Report		Stadium: Hindmarsh Stadium; Attendance: 4,200; Referee: Graham Neal

3 June 1979 11	Footscray JUST	2–0	Brisbane City	Melbourne
	Ilioski 32'; Picioane 34'	Report		Stadium: Olympic Park; Attendance: 1,250; Referee: Tony Beazleigh

10 June 1979 12	APIA Leichhardt	3–2	Footscray JUST	Sydney
	Roberts 11'; Dempsey 65'; Jovicic 86' (o.g.)	Report	Palinkas 54'; Kondarios 70'	Stadium: Wentworth Park; Attendance: 4,287; Referee: Henry Witschge

17 June 1979 13	Footscray JUST	2–0	Newcastle KB United	Melbourne
15:00 AEST	Ilioski 80'; Picioane 87'	Report		Stadium: Olympic Park; Attendance: 1,200; Referee: Stewart Mellings

1 July 1979 15	Footscray JUST	0–1	Sydney Olympic	Melbourne
		Report	Jennings 20'	Stadium: Olympic Park; Attendance: 1,000; Referee: Don Campbell

8 July 1979 16	Brisbane Lions	1–0	Footscray JUST	Brisbane
	Brennan 74'	Report		Stadium: Perry Park; Attendance: 1,200; Referee: Jim Reeves

15 July 1979 17	Footscray JUST	1–2	Canberra City	Melbourne
	Ollerton 47'	Report	Maclaren 57'; Byrne 63'	Stadium: Olympic Park; Attendance: 1,000; Referee: Graham Neal

22 July 1979 18	Footscray JUST	1–0	Sydney City	Melbourne
	Ollerton 85'	Report		Stadium: Olympic Park; Attendance: 800; Referee: Bob Kerr

29 July 1979 19	Marconi Fairfield	0–0	Footscray JUST	Sydney
		Report		Stadium: Marconi Oval; Attendance: 4,800; Referee: Peter Rampley

5 August 1979 20	Footscray JUST	1–3	St George-Budapest	Melbourne
	Lujic 42'	Report	Cotton 43', 53', 89'	Stadium: Olympic Park; Attendance: 1,000; Referee: Nick Karlich

10 August 1979 14	Heidelberg United	2–1	Footscray JUST	Melbourne
	Paton 20'; Cole 77'	Report	Palinkas 62'	Stadium: Olympic Park; Attendance: 1,000; Referee: Chris Bambridge

19 August 1979 21	Adelaide City	1–2	Footscray JUST	Adelaide
	Northcote 35'	Report	Palinkas 60', 77'	Stadium: Olympic Sports Field; Attendance: 2,500; Referee: Don Campbell

26 August 1979 22	South Melbourne	1–1	Footscray JUST	Melbourne
	Kakantonis 82'	Report	Lujic 74'	Stadium: Middle Park Soccer Stadium; Attendance: 4,000; Referee: Jack Johnston

1 September 1979 23	Footscray JUST	0–1	West Adelaide	Melbourne
		Report	McGregor 84'	Stadium: Middle Park Soccer Stadium; Attendance: 1,200; Referee: Tony Beazleigh

9 September 1979 24	Brisbane City	2–1	Footscray JUST	Brisbane
	Campbell 34'; Low 58'	Report	Kondarios 83'	Stadium: Perry Park; Attendance: 2,560; Referee: Bob Mee

15 September 1979 25	Footscray JUST	5–1	APIA Leichhardt	Melbourne
	Picioane 8'; Ollerton 23'; Palinkas 55' (pen.), 77' (pen.); Rujevic 65'	Report	O'Donnell 14'	Stadium: Middle Park Soccer Stadium; Attendance: 2,500; Referee: Don Campbell

22 September 1979 26	Newcastle KB United	3–0	Footscray JUST	Newcastle
14:30 AEST	Boden 21', 24', 39'	Report		Stadium: Newcastle International Sports Centre; Attendance: 7,422; Referee: Tony Boskovic

=== NSL Cup ===
Win Draw Loss

25 April 1979 First round	Footscray JUST	2–1	(Victoria (state)) George Cross	Melbourne
	Palinkas 21'; Rujevic 75'	Report	Thom 15'	Stadium: Olympic Park; Attendance: 6,000; Referee: Stewart Mellings

23 May 1979 Second round	Footscray JUST	2–0	Heidelberg United	Melbourne
	Ilioski 28'; Palinkas 87'	Report		Stadium: Olympic Park; Attendance: 3,000; Referee: Chris Bambridge

27 May 1979 Quarter-finals	Canberra City	4–1	Footscray JUST	Canberra
	Byrne 75', 77'; Cant 50'; Grujicic 81'	Report	Ilioski 87'	Stadium: Bruce Stadium; Attendance: 4,972; Referee: Richard Lorenc

== Statistics ==
=== Appearances and goals ===
Includes all competitions. Players with no appearances not included in the list.

No.	Pos.	Nat.	Player	National Soccer League		NSL Cup		Total	
No.	Pos.	Nat.	Player	Apps	Goals	Apps	Goals	Apps	Goals
1	GK	(Australia)	Steve Potter	22	0	2	0	24	0
2	MF	(Australia)	Zoran Ilioski	21+2	2	3	2	25	4
3	MF	(Socialist Federal Republic of Yugoslavia)	Andrija Ristic	25	0	3	0	28	0
4	—	(Australia)	Radoslav Jovicic	15	0	1+1	0	17	0
5	DF	(Greece)	Jim Kondarios	26	3	3	0	29	3
6	MF	(Socialist Federal Republic of Yugoslavia)	Slobodan Jovanovic	19+1	0	2	0	22	0
7	FW	(Hungary)	Joe Palinkas	26	7	3	2	29	9
8	MF	(Socialist Federal Republic of Yugoslavia)	Mirko Rujevic	15+4	1	1+2	1	22	2
9	MF	(Australia)	Josip Picioane	25	7	2	0	27	7
10	FW	(Australia)	Peter Ollerton	23	4	3	0	26	4
11	MF	(Australia)	Vlatko Belic	1+1	0	0	0	2	0
12	MF	(Australia)	Zdravko Lujic	25	2	1	0	26	2
13	—	(Australia)	Zoran Todorovic	0+2	0	2	0	4	0
15	DF	(Australia)	Igor Hazabent	14+3	0	2+1	0	20	0
18	DF	(Scotland)	Jim O'Reilly	10	0	0	0	10	0
20	—	(Australia)	Milutin Ciric	0+1	0	0	0	1	0
—	—	(Australia)	Steve Carpenter	0+1	0	0	0	1	0
—	FW	(Socialist Federal Republic of Yugoslavia)	Dragan Vasic	2+4	0	2	0	8	0
Player(s) transferred out but featured this season
—	GK	(Scotland)	Dennis Boland	4	0	1	0	5	0
—	FW	(Australia)	Mendo Ristovski	13+3	3	2+1	0	19	3

=== Disciplinary record ===
Includes all competitions. The list is sorted by squad number when total cards are equal. Players with no cards not included in the list.

Rank	No.	Pos.	Nat.	Player	National Soccer League			NSL Cup			Total		
Rank	No.	Pos.	Nat.	Player	Yellow card	Second yellow card	Red card	Yellow card	Second yellow card	Red card	Yellow card	Second yellow card	Red card
1	8	MF	(Socialist Federal Republic of Yugoslavia)	Mirko Rujevic	2	0	2	1	0	0	3	0	2
2	4	—	(Australia)	Radoslav Jovicic	2	0	1	0	0	0	2	0	1
3	10	FW	(Australia)	Peter Ollerton	4	0	0	2	0	0	6	0	0
4	3	MF	(Socialist Federal Republic of Yugoslavia)	Andrija Ristic	4	0	0	1	0	0	6	0	0
5	9	MF	(Australia)	Josip Picioane	2	0	0	2	0	0	4	0	0
5	15	DF	(Australia)	Igor Hazabent	4	0	0	0	0	0	4	0	0
7	12	MF	(Socialist Federal Republic of Yugoslavia)	Zdravko Lujic	3	0	0	0	0	0	3	0	0
7	18	DF	(Scotland)	Jim O'Reilly	3	0	0	0	0	0	3	0	0
9	6	MF	(Socialist Federal Republic of Yugoslavia)	Slobodan Jovanovic	2	0	0	0	0	0	2	0	0
10	2	MF	(Australia)	Zoran Ilioski	1	0	0	0	0	0	1	0	0
Total					29	0	3	6	0	0	33	0	3

=== Clean sheets ===
Includes all competitions. The list is sorted by squad number when total clean sheets are equal. Numbers in parentheses represent games where both goalkeepers participated and both kept a clean sheet; the number in parentheses is awarded to the goalkeeper who was substituted on, whilst a full clean sheet is awarded to the goalkeeper who was on the field at the start of play. Goalkeepers with no clean sheets not included in the list.

Rank	No.	Nat.	Goalkeeper	NSL	NSL Cup	Total
1	1	(Australia)	Steve Potter	5	1	6
2	—	(Australia)	Dennis Boland	1	0	1
Total				6	1	7
