= 1981 Canberra City FC season =

Canberra City
1981 season
- Head Coach: George Murray
- Stadium: Bruce Stadium
- National Soccer League: 5th
- NSL Cup: Second round
- Top goalscorer: League: Walter Valeri (9); All: Walter Valeri (11)
- Highest home attendance: 5,682 vs. Sydney Olympic (5 April 1981); National Soccer League
- Lowest home attendance: 1,603 vs. Brisbane Lions (2 August 1981); National Soccer League
- Average home league attendance: 3,847
- Biggest win: 5–0 vs. Footscray JUST (H) (20 April 1981); National Soccer League
- Biggest defeat: 1–5 vs. Heidelberg United (H) (19 July 1981); National Soccer League

The 1981 season was the fifth in the history of Canberra City Football Club. In addition to the domestic league, they also participated in the NSL Cup. Canberra City finished 5th in their National Soccer League season, and were eliminated in the second round of the NSL Cup.

== Players ==
Note: Flags indicate national team as defined under FIFA eligibility rules; some limited exceptions apply. Players may hold more than one non-FIFA nationality.

No.	Pos.	Nation	Player
2	DF	FIJ	Keni Kawaleva
3	DF	ENG	Roy Stark
4	MF	SCO	Isaac Farrell
5	DF	AUS	Harry Williams
6	DF	AUS	Terry Byrne
7	DF	AUS	Robbie O'Shea
8	MF	NZL	Duncan Cole
10	MF	AUS	Walter Valeri
11	FW	AUS	Tony Brennan
12	FW	ENG	George Bailey
13	FW	SCO	Ian Purdie

No.	Pos.	Nation	Player
14	MF	NED	John Massa
15	GK	AUS	Steve Hoszowski
—	DF	SCO	John Brown
—	DF	AUS	Mark Francis
—	FW	AUS	Sebastian Giampaolo
—	MF	SCO	Ian Gibson
—	FW	SCO	Don Maclaren
—	DF	AUS	John Moutsopoulos
—	DF	AUS	John O'Shea
—	DF	AUS	Mike O'Shea
—	MF	AUS	Ian Stone

== Competitions ==
=== Overall record ===
Competition	First match	Last match	Starting round	Final position	Record							
Competition	First match	Last match	Starting round	Final position	Pld	W	D	L	GF	GA	GD	Win %
National Soccer League	15 February 1981	13 September 1981	Matchday 1	5th	30	13	7	10	41	32	+9	43.33
NSL Cup	22 March 1981	8 June 1981	First round	Second round	2	1	0	1	4	5	−1	50.00
Total					32	14	7	11	45	37	+8	43.75

Source: Competitions

=== National Soccer League ===
==== League table ====
Pos	Team	Pld	W	D	L	GF	GA	GD	Pts	Relegation
1	Sydney City (C)	30	19	5	6	59	30	+29	43	
2	South Melbourne	30	13	13	4	41	27	+14	39	
3	Brisbane City	30	12	11	7	37	25	+12	35	
4	APIA Leichhardt	30	12	11	7	39	33	+6	35	
5	Canberra City	30	13	7	10	41	32	+9	33	
6	Brisbane Lions	30	11	11	8	41	33	+8	33	
7	Adelaide City	30	13	6	11	46	42	+4	32	
8	Heidelberg United	30	12	7	11	48	40	+8	31	
9	Sydney Olympic	30	11	9	10	46	46	0	31	
10	Newcastle KB United	30	11	8	11	41	41	0	30	
11	Wollongong City	30	8	12	10	35	39	−4	28	
12	Preston Makedonia	30	9	7	14	39	41	−2	25	
13	Footscray JUST	30	9	7	14	32	48	−16	25	
14	Marconi Fairfield	30	9	7	14	23	45	−22	25	
15	Blacktown City (R)	30	6	9	15	32	47	−15	21	Relegated to the 1982 NSW State League
16	West Adelaide	30	5	4	21	26	57	−31	14	

Updated to match(es) played on unknown. Source: rsssf.com
Rules for classification: 1) points; 2) goal difference; 3) number of goals scored.
(C) Champions; (R) Relegated

==== Results summary ====
Overall								Home						Away					
Pld	W	D	L	GF	GA	GD	Pts	W	D	L	GF	GA	GD	W	D	L	GF	GA	GD
30	13	7	10	41	32	+9	46	7	4	4	27	17	+10	6	3	6	14	15	−1

Source: worldfootball.net

==== Results by round ====
Round	1	2	3	4	5	6	7	8	9	10	11	12	13	14	15	16	17	18	19	20	21	22	23	24	25	26	27	28	29	30
Ground	A	H	A	H	H	A	H	A	H	A	H	A	H	A	H	A	H	A	A	H	A	H	A	H	A	H	A	H	A	H
Result	W	D	D	W	L	W	W	D	W	L	D	W	L	W	D	L	W	L	D	D	W	L	L	L	W	W	L	W	L	W
Position	4	6	7	4	7	5	4	3	2	2	2	2	3	3	3	4	3	5	5	5	4	5	7	7	7	7	7	6	7	5
Points	2	3	4	6	6	8	10	11	13	13	14	16	16	18	19	19	21	21	22	23	25	25	25	25	27	29	29	31	31	33

Source: worldfootball.net
A = Away; H = Home; W = Win; D = Draw; L = Loss

==== Matches ====
Win Draw Loss

15 February 1981 1	Preston Makedonia	0–1	Canberra City	Melbourne
		Report	R. O'Shea 23'	Stadium: B.T. Connor Reserve; Attendance: 4,000; Referee: Jim Fearn

22 February 1981 2	Canberra City	0–0	Adelaide City	Canberra
16:00 AEST		Report		Stadium: Bruce Stadium; Attendance: 2,642; Referee: Bob Mee

1 March 1981 3	Brisbane City	0–0	Canberra City	Brisbane
		Report		Stadium: Spencer Park; Attendance: 2,000; Referee: Gary Power

7 March 1981 4	Canberra City	2–0	Sydney City	Canberra
16:00 AEST	Valeri 10', 58'	Report		Stadium: Bruce Stadium; Attendance: 2,893; Referee: Ken Allen

15 March 1981 5	Canberra City	1–2	West Adelaide	Canberra
15:00 AEST	Farrell 66'	Report	Bozanic 10'; Boyle 72'	Stadium: Bruce Stadium; Attendance: 3,170; Referee: Gary Power

29 March 1981 6	Marconi Fairfield	0–2	Canberra City	Sydney
15:00 AEST		Report	Valeri 61', 86' (pen.)	Stadium: Marconi Oval; Attendance: 3,700; Referee: Ken Small

5 April 1981 7	Canberra City	2–1	Sydney Olympic	Canberra
15:00 AEST	Brennan 64'; Gibson 72'	Report	Cotton 31'	Stadium: Bruce Stadium; Attendance: 5,682; Referee: Chris Bambridge

12 April 1981 8	Heidelberg United	1–1	Canberra City	Melbourne
	Taylor 58'	Report	J. O'Shea 68'	Stadium: Olympic Park; Attendance: 3,192; Referee: Evan Venios

20 April 1981 9	Canberra City	5–0	Footscray JUST	Canberra
	Brennan 1'; Gibson 43', 66', 80'; Maclaren 78'	Report		Stadium: Bruce Stadium; Attendance: 6,190; Referee: Bob Mee

26 April 1981 10	Brisbane Lions	1–0	Canberra City	Brisbane
	Millman 32'	Report		Stadium: Richlands Stadium; Attendance: 1,300; Referee: Dave Nugent

3 May 1981 11	Canberra City	2–2	Blacktown City	Canberra
	J. O'Shea 15'; Byrne 50'	Report	Burrows 18', 34'	Stadium: Bruce Stadium; Attendance: 5,750; Referee: Ken Allen

10 May 1981 12	Newcastle KB United	0–1	Canberra City	Newcastle
		Report	Gibson 60'	Stadium: Newcastle International Sports Centre; Attendance: 3,827; Referee: Jim REeves

17 May 1981 13	Canberra City	0–1	APIA Leichhardt	Canberra
		Report	Morsello 59'	Stadium: Bruce Stadium; Attendance: 4,676; Referee: Evan Venios

24 May 1981 14	Wollongong City	0–1	Canberra City	Wollongong
		Report	Valeri 78'	Stadium: Wollongong Showground; Attendance: 3,015; Referee: Richard Lorenc

31 May 1981 15	Canberra City	2–2	South Melbourne	Canberra
	Maclaren 24'; Brennan 36'	Report	Christopoulos 24' (pen.); Blair 70'	Stadium: Bruce Stadium; Attendance: 6,247; Referee: Bob Mee

7 June 1981 16	Adelaide City	1–0	Canberra City	Adelaide
	Jones 89'	Report		Stadium: Olympic Sports Field; Attendance: 3,289; Referee: Jim Rossis

14 June 1981 17	Canberra City	3–0	Brisbane City	Canberra
	Maclaren 41'; Brennan 56'; Purdie 87'	Report		Stadium: Bruce Stadium; Attendance: 2,891; Referee: Ken Allen

21 June 1981 18	Sydney City	3–2	Canberra City	Sydney
	O'Connor 54'; Boden 57'; Kosmina 61'	Report	J. O'Shea 18'; Mullen 30' (o.g.)	Stadium: ES Marks Athletics Field; Attendance: 2,414; Referee: Tony Boskovic

28 June 1981 19	West Adelaide	1–1	Canberra City	Adelaide
	Manecas 66'	Report	Maclaren 29'	Stadium: Hindmarsh Stadium; Attendance: 3,600; Referee: Don Campbell

5 July 1981 20	Canberra City	0–0	Marconi Fairfield	Canberra
		Report		Stadium: Bruce Stadium; Attendance: 4,160; Referee: Bob Mee

12 July 1981 21	Sydney Olympic	0–2	Canberra City	Sydney
		Report	Purdie 31'; Gibson 68'	Stadium: Pratten Park; Attendance: 6,150; Referee: Richard Lorenc

19 July 1981 22	Canberra City	1–5	Heidelberg United	Canberra
	Purdie 17'	Report	Cole 47', 60'; Paton 75', 90'; Tasevski 90'	Stadium: Bruce Stadium; Attendance: 4,060; Referee: Tony Boskovic

26 July 1981 23	Footscray JUST	3–1	Canberra City	Melbourne
	Ilioski 39' (pen.); Kondarios 59'; Cozzella 71'	Report	R. O'Shea 84'	Stadium: Schintler Reserve; Attendance: 2,300; Referee: Evan Venios

2 August 1981 24	Canberra City	2–3	Brisbane Lions	Canberra
	Valeri 60'; R. O'Shea 72'	Report	Williamson 1', 80'; Bennett 48'	Stadium: Bruce Stadium; Attendance: 1,603; Referee: Bob Mee

9 August 1981 25	Blacktown City	0–2	Canberra City	Sydney
		Report	Cole 17'; Valeri 19'	Stadium: Gabbie Stadium; Attendance: 2,740; Referee: Tim Davies

16 August 1981 26	Canberra City	4–1	Newcastle KB United	Canberra
	Byrne 14'; Brennan 32'; Valeri 78'	Report	Jones 8'	Stadium: Bruce Stadium; Attendance: 2,100; Referee: Ken Allen

23 August 1981 27	APIA Leichhardt	4–0	Canberra City	Sydney
15:00 AEST	Morsello 25'; Giampaolo 31'; Bradley 41'; Soper 60'	Report		Stadium: Lambert Park; Attendance: 3,614; Referee: Don Campbell

30 August 1981 28	Canberra City	2–0	Wollongong City	Canberra
	Valeri 6' (pen.); Gibson 82'	Report		Stadium: Bruce Stadium; Attendance: 2,500; Referee: Bob Mee

6 September 1981 29	South Melbourne	1–0	Canberra City	Melbourne
	Evans 55' (pen.)	Report		Stadium: Middle Park Soccer Stadium; Attendance: 4,000; Referee: Evan Venios

13 September 1981 30	Canberra City	1–0	Preston Makedonia	Canberra
	Gibson 10'	Report		Stadium: Bruce Stadium; Attendance: 3,142; Referee: Jim Fearn

=== NSL Cup ===
Win Draw Loss

22 March 1981 First round	Canberra City	2–1	Newcastle KB United	Canberra
	Valeri 48', 64'	Report	Mountford 29'	Stadium: Bruce Stadium; Attendance: 3,025; Referee: Tim Davies

8 July 1981 Second round	Canberra City	2–4	Sydney Olympic	Canberra
	Gibson ?'; Maclaren 63'	Report	Koussas 8', 40'; Wilson ?'; Rowden 25'	Stadium: Bruce Stadium; Attendance: 4,300; Referee: Tim Davies

== Statistics ==
=== Appearances and goals ===
Includes all competitions. Players with no appearances not included in the list.

No.	Pos.	Nat.	Player	National Soccer League		NSL Cup		Total	
No.	Pos.	Nat.	Player	Apps	Goals	Apps	Goals	Apps	Goals
3	DF	(England)	Roy Stark	15	0	2	0	17	0
4	MF	(Scotland)	Isaac Farrell	10+8	1	1+1	0	20	1
5	DF	(Australia)	Harry Williams	10	0	1	0	11	0
6	DF	(Australia)	Terry Byrne	27	2	2	0	29	2
7	DF	(Australia)	Robbie O'Shea	26+2	3	2	0	30	3
8	MF	(New Zealand)	Duncan Cole	22+1	1	2	0	25	1
10	MF	(Australia)	Walter Valeri	16+9	9	2	2	27	11
11	FW	(Australia)	Tony Brennan	27	5	2	0	29	5
13	FW	(Scotland)	Ian Purdie	17+3	4	1	0	21	4
14	MF	(Netherlands)	John Massa	8+13	0	0+1	0	22	0
15	GK	(Australia)	Steve Hoszowski	21	0	0	0	21	0
—	FW	(Australia)	Sebastian Giampaolo	1+3	0	0	0	4	0
—	MF	(Scotland)	Ian Gibson	22+2	8	1	1	25	9
—	FW	(Scotland)	Don Maclaren	24+4	4	2	1	30	5
—	DF	(Australia)	John Moutsopoulos	14	0	0	0	14	0
—	DF	(Australia)	John O'Shea	30	3	1	0	31	3
—	DF	(Australia)	Mike O'Shea	30	0	2	0	32	0
—	MF	(Australia)	Ian Stone	1+2	0	0	0	3	0
Player(s) transferred out but featured this season
1	GK	(New Zealand)	Richard Wilson	9	0	2	0	11	0

=== Disciplinary record ===
Includes all competitions. The list is sorted by squad number when total cards are equal. Players with no cards not included in the list.

Rank	No.	Pos.	Nat.	Player	National Soccer League			NSL Cup			Total		
Rank	No.	Pos.	Nat.	Player	Yellow card	Second yellow card	Red card	Yellow card	Second yellow card	Red card	Yellow card	Second yellow card	Red card
1	11	FW	(Australia)	Tony Brennan	4	0	0	0	0	0	4	0	0
1	—	FW	(Scotland)	Don Maclaren	4	0	0	0	0	0	4	0	0
3	6	DF	(Australia)	Terry Byrne	3	0	0	0	0	0	3	0	0
3	—	DF	(Australia)	John O'Shea	3	0	0	0	0	0	3	0	0
5	7	DF	(Australia)	Robbie O'Shea	2	0	0	0	0	0	2	0	0
5	13	FW	(Australia)	Ian Purdie	2	0	0	0	0	0	2	0	0
5	—	DF	(Australia)	John Moutsopoulos	2	0	0	0	0	0	2	0	0
5	—	DF	(Australia)	Mike O'Shea	2	0	0	0	0	0	2	0	0
9	3	DF	(England)	Roy Stark	1	0	0	0	0	0	1	0	0
9	5	DF	(Australia)	Harry Williams	1	0	0	0	0	0	1	0	0
9	8	MF	(New Zealand)	Duncan Cole	1	0	0	0	0	0	1	0	0
9	10	MF	(Australia)	Walter Valeri	1	0	0	0	0	0	1	0	0
9	14	MF	(Netherlands)	John Massa	1	0	0	0	0	0	1	0	0
9	—	MF	(Scotland)	Ian Gibson	1	0	0	0	0	0	1	0	0
9	—	MF	(Australia)	Ian Stone	1	0	0	0	0	0	1	0	0
Total					31	0	0	0	0	0	31	0	0

=== Clean sheets ===
Includes all competitions. The list is sorted by squad number when total clean sheets are equal. Numbers in parentheses represent games where both goalkeepers participated and both kept a clean sheet; the number in parentheses is awarded to the goalkeeper who was substituted on, whilst a full clean sheet is awarded to the goalkeeper who was on the field at the start of play. Goalkeepers with no clean sheets not included in the list.

Rank	No.	Nat.	Goalkeeper	NSL	NSL Cup	Total
1	15	(Australia)	Steve Hoszowski	9	0	9
2	1	(Australia)	Richard Wilson	5	0	5
Total				14	0	14
