= 1982 Preston Makedonia FC season =

Preston Makedonia
1982 season
- Head Coach: Peter Ollerton
- Stadium: B.T. Connor Reserve
- National Soccer League: 5th
- NSL Cup: Quarter-finals
- Top goalscorer: League: Gary Ward (10); All: Gary Ward (11)
- Highest home attendance: 6,500 vs. Heidelberg United (4 April 1982); National Soccer League
- Lowest home attendance: 1,000 vs. St George-Budapest (18 July 1982); National Soccer League
- Average home league attendance: 3,567
- Biggest win: 5–1 vs. Canberra City (H) (21 March 1982); National Soccer League
- Biggest defeat: 0–5 vs. Sydney City (H) (6 June 1982); National Soccer League

The 1982 season was the second in the National Soccer League for Preston Makedonia Football Club (now Preston Lions). In addition to the domestic league, they also participated in the NSL Cup. Preston Makedonia finished 5th in their National Soccer League season, and were eliminated in the quarter-finals of the NSL Cup.

== Players ==
Note: Flags indicate national team as defined under FIFA eligibility rules; some limited exceptions apply. Players may hold more than one non-FIFA nationality.

No.	Pos.	Nation	Player
—	DF	ENG	Steve Beech
—	FW	AUS	Peter Boyle
—	FW	ENG	Duggie Brown
—	FW	AUS	Robbie Cullen
—	MF	SCO	Gordon Flavell
—		AUS	Graham Fox
—	DF	AUS	David Jones
—	MF	AUS	John Little
—	MF	AUS	Claude Lucchesi
—	FW	SCO	George McMillan
—	DF	RSA	Richard Miranda

No.	Pos.	Nation	Player
—	FW	AUS	Peter Ollerton
—	DF	AUS	Con Opasinis
—	DF	AUS	Ljube Petrovski
—	GK	AUS	Steve Potter
—	DF	AUS	Mike Rainey
—	MF	AUS	Con Stoikos
—	DF	YUG	George Todorovski
—	FW	AUS	Gary Ward
—	FW	ENG	Alan Whittle
—	GK	NZL	Richard Wilson

== Competitions ==
=== Overall record ===
Competition	First match	Last match	Starting round	Final position	Record							
Competition	First match	Last match	Starting round	Final position	Pld	W	D	L	GF	GA	GD	Win %
National Soccer League	14 February 1982	5 September 1982	Matchday 1	5th	30	12	10	8	45	41	+4	40.00
NSL Cup	14 June 1982	14 July 1982	First round	Quarter-finals	2	1	0	1	2	1	+1	50.00
Total					32	13	10	9	47	42	+5	40.63

Source: Competitions

=== National Soccer League ===
==== League table ====
Pos	Team	Pld	W	D	L	GF	GA	GD	Pts	Relegation
1	Sydney City (C)	30	20	5	5	68	28	+40	45	Qualification to Finals series (Note: The Finals series was not considered the championship for the 1982 National Soccer League.)
2	St George-Budapest	30	14	8	8	47	40	+7	36	Qualification to Finals series
3	Wollongong City	30	16	3	11	43	46	−3	35	Qualification to Finals series
4	Heidelberg United	30	13	8	9	42	37	+5	34	Qualification to Finals series
5	Preston Makedonia	30	12	10	8	45	41	+4	34	
6	South Melbourne	30	11	9	10	46	37	+9	31	
7	APIA Leichhardt	30	12	7	11	49	54	−5	31	
8	Sydney Olympic	30	12	6	12	52	42	+10	30	
9	West Adelaide	30	10	8	12	44	40	+4	28	
10	Marconi Fairfield	30	12	4	14	44	43	+1	28	
11	Brisbane Lions	30	10	8	12	39	42	−3	28	
12	Newcastle KB United	30	10	7	13	43	52	−9	27	
13	Adelaide City	30	6	12	12	36	44	−8	24	
14	Footscray JUST	30	5	14	11	34	46	−12	24	
15	Canberra City	30	7	10	13	37	54	−17	24	
16	Brisbane City	30	5	11	14	32	55	−23	21	

Source: rsssf.com
Rules for classification: 1) points; 2) goal difference; 3) number of goals scored.
(C) Champions

==== Results summary ====
Overall								Home						Away					
Pld	W	D	L	GF	GA	GD	Pts	W	D	L	GF	GA	GD	W	D	L	GF	GA	GD
30	12	10	8	45	41	+4	46	8	4	3	29	17	+12	4	6	5	16	24	−8

Source: worldfootball.net

==== Results by round ====
Round	1	2	3	4	5	6	7	8	9	10	11	12	13	14	15	16	17	18	19	20	21	22	23	24	25	26	27	28	29	30
Ground	A	H	A	H	A	H	A	H	A	H	A	H	H	A	H	A	H	A	H	A	H	A	H	A	H	A	A	H	A	H
Result	D	D	L	W	W	W	D	D	L	W	L	D	W	L	D	L	L	W	W	D	L	D	L	D	W	W	D	W	W	W
Position	7	8	11	9	6	5	8	8	6	5	8	8	7	8	7	8	9	8	7	7	8	8	10	10	8	7	7	5	5	5
Points	1	2	2	4	6	8	9	10	10	12	12	13	15	15	16	16	16	18	20	21	21	22	22	23	25	27	28	30	32	34

Source: worldfootball.net
A = Away; H = Home; W = Win; D = Draw; L = Loss

==== Matches ====
Win Draw Loss

14 February 1982 1	Sydney City	1–1	Preston Makedonia	Sydney
	Bruce 2'	Report	Brown 32'	Stadium: St George Stadium; Attendance: 1,480; Referee: Peter Rampley

21 February 1982 2	Preston Makedonia	1–1	West Adelaide	Melbourne
	Ollerton 87'	Report	Wright 78' (pen.)	Stadium: B.T. Connor Reserve; Attendance: 3,700; Referee: Jim Fearn

28 February 1982 3	APIA Leichhardt	4–2	Preston Makedonia	Sydney
	Giampaolo 3', 88'; Bradley 40'; Soper 84'	Report	Whittle 65'; Cullen 80'	Stadium: Lambert Park; Attendance: 4,419; Referee: Richard Lorenc

7 March 1982 4	Preston Makedonia	3–1	Brisbane City	Melbourne
	Brown 65', 87'; Ollerton 75'	Report	Carey 68'	Stadium: B.T. Connor Reserve; Attendance: 4,000; Referee: Stewart Mellings

14 March 1982 5	Footscray JUST	0–1	Preston Makedonia	Melbourne
		Report	Ward 70'	Stadium: Schintler Reserve; Attendance: 4,910; Referee: Chris Bambridge

21 March 1982 6	Preston Makedonia	5–1	Canberra City	Melbourne
	Ward 24', 59'; Brown 36' (pen.), 88'; Boyle 61'	Report	Brennan 20'	Stadium: B.T. Connor Reserve; Attendance: 4,500; Referee: David Yelland

27 March 1982 7	Newcastle KB United	1–1	Preston Makedonia	Newcastle
	McClelland 62'	Report	Brown 64'	Stadium: Newcastle International Sports Centre; Attendance: 2,965; Referee: Ken Small

4 April 1982 8	Preston Makedonia	0–0	Heidelberg United	Melbourne
		Report		Stadium: B.T. Connor Reserve; Attendance: 6,500; Referee: Dennis Voutsinas

11 April 1982 9	St George-Budapest	2–0	Preston Makedonia	Sydney
	Barton 4'; O'Shea 75'	Report		Stadium: St George Stadium; Attendance: 3,258; Referee: Gary Power

18 April 1982 10	Preston Makedonia	2–1	Adelaide City	Melbourne
	Ollerton 42' (pen.), 85'	Report	J. Nyskohus 35' (pen.)	Stadium: B.T. Connor Reserve; Attendance: 2,500; Referee: Chris Bambridge

25 April 1982 11	Marconi Fairfield	4–1	Preston Makedonia	Sydney
	Hunter 2' (?); Vieri 30'; Jankovics 79'	Report	Lucchesi 57'	Stadium: Marconi Stadium; Attendance: 2,721; Referee: Brian Fowler

2 May 1982 12	Preston Makedonia	1–1	Brisbane Lions	Melbourne
	Brown 4'	Report	Millman 36'	Stadium: B.T. Connor Reserve; Attendance: 2,000; Referee: Jim Fearn

9 May 1982 13	Preston Makedonia	4–1	Sydney Olympic	Melbourne
	Lucchesi 40'; Ward 43'; Brown 47', 48'	Report	Redfern 66' (pen.)	Stadium: B.T. Connor Reserve; Attendance: 5,000; Referee: Evan Venios

16 May 1982 14	Wollongong City	1–0	Preston Makedonia	Wollongong
	Cotton 1'	Report		Stadium: Wollongong Showground; Attendance: 3,176; Referee: Ken Small

23 May 1982 15	Preston Makedonia	1–1	South Melbourne	Melbourne
	Petrovski 54'	Report	Egan 32'	Stadium: B.T. Connor Reserve; Attendance: 5,000; Referee: Chris Bambridge

30 May 1982 16	West Adelaide	5–1	Preston Makedonia	Adelaide
	Dunn 9'; Brennan 25'; Atsalas 38'; Heys 76', 89'	Report	Lucchesi 78'	Stadium: Hindmarsh Stadium; Attendance: 2,563; Referee: Jim Rossis

6 June 1982 17	Preston Makedonia	0–5	Sydney City	Melbourne
		Report	Barnes 13'; Murray 30'; Kosmina 65', 88'; Spanos 79'	Stadium: B.T. Connor Reserve; Attendance: 4,150; Referee: Don Campbell

13 June 1982 18	Brisbane City	1–2	Preston Makedonia	Brisbane
	Hamilton 26'	Report	Whittle 19'; Ollerton 61'	Stadium: Spencer Park; Attendance: 1,400; Referee: Alan Kibbler

20 June 1982 19	Preston Makedonia	2–0	APIA Leichhardt	Melbourne
	Lucchesi 12'; Ollerton 89' (pen.)	Report		Stadium: B.T. Connor Reserve; Attendance: 1,800; Referee: Evan Venios

27 June 1982 20	Canberra City	1–1	Preston Makedonia	Canberra
	Bryant 84'	Report	Lucchesi 1'	Stadium: Bruce Stadium; Attendance: 2,000; Referee: Bob Mee

4 July 1982 21	Preston Makedonia	1–2	Newcastle KB United	Melbourne
	Ward 24'	Report	Hamilton 24'; Drinkwater 44' (pen.)	Stadium: B.T. Connor Reserve; Attendance: 3,000; Referee: David Yelland

11 July 1982 22	Heidelberg United	0–0	Preston Makedonia	Melbourne
		Report		Stadium: Olympic Village; Attendance: 6,000; Referee: Chris Bambridge

18 July 1982 23	Preston Makedonia	0–1	St George-Budapest	Melbourne
		Report	Barton 84'	Stadium: B.T. Connor Reserve; Attendance: 1,000; Referee: Stewart Mellings

25 July 1982 24	Adelaide City	0–0	Preston Makedonia	Adelaide
		Report		Stadium: Olympic Sports Field; Attendance: 1,500; Referee: Bob Kerr

1 August 1982 25	Preston Makedonia	4–1	Marconi Fairfield	Melbourne
	Ward 3', 12'; McMillan 52'; Calderan 59' (o.g.)	Report	Jankovics 59'	Stadium: B.T. Connor Reserve; Attendance: 1,500; Referee: Evan Venios

8 August 1982 26	Brisbane Lions	2–3	Preston Makedonia	Brisbane
	Williamson 42' (pen.); Low 73'	Report	McMillan 16'; Jackson 33' (o.g.); Ward 37'	Stadium: Richlands Stadium; Attendance: 500; Referee: Dave Nugent

15 August 1982 27	Sydney Olympic	2–2	Preston Makedonia	Sydney
	Katholos 17', 67' (pen.)	Report	Ward 69'; McMillan 85'	Stadium: Pratten Park; Attendance: 3,428; Referee: Peter Rampley

22 August 1982 28	Preston Makedonia	2–1	Wollongong City	Melbourne
	McMillan 61'; Ward 68'	Report	O'Connor 50'	Stadium: B.T. Connor Reserve; Attendance: 4,000; Referee: Chris Bambridge

29 August 1982 29	South Melbourne	0–1	Preston Makedonia	Melbourne
		Report	Brown 89'	Stadium: Middle Park Soccer Stadium; Attendance: 6,000; Referee: Tim Davies

5 September 1982 30	Preston Makedonia	3–0	Footscray JUST	Melbourne
	Brown 10'; McMillan 28', 52'	Report		Stadium: B.T. Connor Reserve; Attendance: 5,000; Referee: Stewart Mellings

=== NSL Cup ===
14 June 1982 First round	Preston Makedonia	2–0	Footscray JUST	Melbourne
	Opasinis 5'; Ward 23'	Report		Stadium: B.T. Connor Reserve; Attendance: 2,500; Referee: Stewart Mellings

14 July 1982 Quarter-finals	Heidelberg United	1–0	Preston Makedonia	Melbourne
	Valentine 75'	Report		Stadium: Olympic Park; Attendance: 1,000; Referee: Jim Fearn

== Statistics ==
=== Appearances and goals ===
Includes all competitions. Players with no appearances not included in the list.

No.	Pos	Nat	Player	Total		National Soccer League		NSL Cup	
No.	Pos	Nat	Player	Apps	Goals	Apps	Goals	Apps	Goals
	DF	(England) ENG	Steve Beech	16	0	14+2	0	0	0
	FW	(Australia) AUS	Peter Boyle	15	1	15	1	0	0
	FW	(England) ENG	Duggie Brown	30	11	26+2	11	2	0
	FW	(Australia) AUS	Robbie Cullen	8	1	8	1	0	0
	GK	(Scotland) SCO	Gordon Flavell	31	0	29	0	2	0
		(Australia) AUS	Graham Fox	23	0	20+2	0	1	0
	DF	(Australia) AUS	David Jones	16	0	14	0	2	0
	MF	(Australia) AUS	John Little	11	0	10	0	1	0
	MF	(Australia) AUS	Claude Lucchesi	19	5	18	5	1	0
	FW	(Scotland) SCO	George McMillan	22	6	21	6	1	0
	DF	(South Africa) RSA	Richard Miranda	18	0	10+6	0	1+1	0
	FW	(Australia) AUS	Peter Ollerton	25	6	13+11	6	1	0
	DF	(Australia) AUS	Con Opasinis	11	1	9	0	2	1
	DF	(Australia) AUS	Ljube Petrovski	29	1	27	1	1+1	0
	GK	(Australia) AUS	Steve Potter	17	0	16	0	1	0
	DF	(Australia) AUS	Mike Rainey	3	0	3	0	0	0
	MF	(Australia) AUS	Con Stoikos	2	0	1	0	1	0
	DF	(Socialist Federal Republic of Yugoslavia) YUG	George Todorovski	19	0	18	0	1	0
	FW	(Australia) AUS	Gary Ward	27	11	24+2	10	1	1
	FW	(England) ENG	Alan Whittle	21	2	20	2	1	0
	GK	(New Zealand) NZL	Richard Wilson	15	0	14	0	1	0

=== Disciplinary record ===
Includes all competitions. The list is sorted by squad number when total cards are equal. Players with no cards not included in the list.

No.	Pos	Nat	Player	Total			National Soccer League			NSL Cup		
No.	Pos	Nat	Player	Yellow card	Second yellow card	Red card	Yellow card	Second yellow card	Red card	Yellow card	Second yellow card	Red card
	DF	(Socialist Federal Republic of Yugoslavia) YUG	George Todorovski	3	0	1	3	0	1	0	0	0
	DF	(Australia) AUS	Ljube Petrovski	4	0	0	4	0	0	0	0	0
	FW	(England) ENG	Duggie Brown	3	0	0	3	0	0	0	0	0
	FW	(Australia) AUS	Peter Boyle	3	0	0	3	0	0	0	0	0
	GK	(Scotland) SCO	Gordon Flavell	3	0	0	3	0	0	0	0	0
	MF	(Australia) AUS	Claude Lucchesi	3	0	0	3	0	0	0	0	0
	DF	(South Africa) RSA	Richard Miranda	3	0	0	3	0	0	0	0	0
		(Australia) AUS	Graham Fox	2	0	0	2	0	0	0	0	0
	DF	(Australia) AUS	David Jones	2	0	0	2	0	0	0	0	0
	FW	(Australia) AUS	Peter Ollerton	2	0	0	2	0	0	0	0	0
	FW	(Australia) AUS	Gary Ward	2	0	0	2	0	0	0	0	0
	DF	(England) ENG	Steve Beech	1	0	0	1	0	0	0	0	0
	FW	(Australia) AUS	Robbie Cullen	1	0	0	1	0	0	0	0	0
	MF	(Australia) AUS	John Little	1	0	0	1	0	0	0	0	0
	FW	(Scotland) SCO	George McMillan	1	0	0	1	0	0	0	0	0

- (yellow card) = Number of bookings; (second yellow card) = Number of sending offs after a second yellow card; (red card) = Number of sending offs by a direct red card.
