= Oscar Langone =

Argentine footballer (born 1953)

Personal information
- Date of birth: 30 March 1953 (age 73)
- Place of birth: Buenos Aires, Argentina

Oscar Langone (born 30 March 1953) is an Argentinian former professional football player for Club Atlético Banfield in Argentina's Primera Division.

== Early life ==
Oscar Langone was born on 30 March 1958, in Buenos Aires, Argentina. In 1977, he moved with his family to Australia.

== Club career ==
He spent the part of the 1970s playing in Australia's National Soccer League. His coaching career began in 1994, when he was hired by Capital Football to coach their junior representative teams. He was promoted as head coach for Canberra City FC, where he spent the next nine years managing some of the top state premier football clubs, academies and representative teams. In 2005, he was hired by the Football Federation Australia under the guidance of FFA technical director and head coach Guus Hiddink for Australia's 2005 World Cup Qualifying campaign.

== Coaching career ==
- 1994–1995: Capital Football, Representative Coach
- 1996–1997: Canberra City Football Club, Head Coach
- 1998–1999: Majura Junior Club, Capital Football League Head Coach
- 2000–2001: Belconnen United, Capital Football League Head Coach
- 2003–2004: Belconnen Blue Devils, N.S.W. Premier League
- 2005: Football Federation of Australia, Scout
- 2006–2007: Musgrave Soccer Club, Gold Coast Premier League Head Coach
- 2008: Gold Coast Soccer, Representative Coach
- 2009–2010: Gold Coast United, Hyundai "A" League Match Analyst
- 2012: Gold Coast Stars, Head Coach
- 2013: Palm Beach NPL, Head Coach
- 2014: Merrimac FC, Gold Coast Premier League Head Coach
