= Ron McIvor =

Scottish footballer (1951–2021)

Personal information
- Full name: Ronald William MacIvor
- Date of birth: 23 March 1951
- Place of birth: Edinburgh, Scotland
- Date of death: December 2021 (aged 70)
- Position: Defender

Senior career*
Years	Team	Apps	(Gls)
1972–1979	East Fife	179	(8)
1979–1980	Wigan Athletic	3	(1)
1981	Preston Makedonia	5	(0)
- * Club domestic league appearances and goals

Ronald William McIvor (23 March 1951 – December 2021) was a Scottish footballer, who played for Bonnyrigg Rose Athletic, East Fife, Wigan Athletic and Preston Makedonia. McIvor died in December 2021, at the age of 70.
