= Duncan Cole =

New Zealand footballer (1958–2014)

Personal information
- Full name: Duncan Edward Cole
- Date of birth: 12 July 1958
- Place of birth: England
- Date of death: 21 May 2014 (aged 55)
- Place of death: Auckland, New Zealand
- Height: 1.74 m (5 ft 9 in)
- Position: Midfielder

Senior career*
Years	Team	Apps	(Gls)
1975–1979	North Shore United	86	(17)
1980–1981	Canberra City	47	(2)
1982	North Shore United	12	(4)
1982–1983	Canberra City	19	(3)
1982	→Tung Sing(loan)	6	(1)
1984–1988	North Shore United	100	(13)

International career
1978–1988	New Zealand	58	(4)
- * Club domestic league appearances and goals

Duncan Edward Cole (12 July 1958 – 21 May 2014) was a New Zealand association football player who represented New Zealand at the 1982 FIFA World Cup in Spain.

Cole attended Birkdale Intermediate and was a Foundation Pupil at Birkdale College (now Birkenhead College) when it opened in 1972. He excelled at all sports, but particularly soccer and athletics.

His senior career began with North Shore United before he moved to Australia to join Canberra City in the Australian National Soccer League

Cole made his full All Whites debut in a 2–0 win over Singapore on 1 October 1978. He was an integral member of the 1982 All Whites as they qualified for the 1982 FIFA World Cup in Spain, playing in all 15 qualifiers and all three group games in the finals tournament, where they lost to Scotland, USSR and Brazil.

Cole ended his international playing career with 58 A-international caps and 4 goals to his credit, his final cap in a 0–1 loss to Israel on 27 March 1988.

== Death ==
He died in Auckland on 21 May 2014 at the age of 55.

Since 2023, Birkenhead College has held an annual alumni football game for the Duncan Cole Memorial Cup. The cup was presented to the college by the Cole family.
