= Johan Verweij =

New Zealand footballer

Personal information
- Full name: Johan Verweij
- Date of birth: 6 April 1960 (age 66)
- Place of birth: New Zealand
- Position: Midfielder

Youth career
- Christchurch United
- Feyenoord (Netherlands)

Senior career*
Years	Team	Apps	(Gls)
1979, 1982–1993	Christchurch United		
1980–1981	Brisbane Lions (Australian NSL)		
1981	Footscray JUST (loan)		

International career
1979–1983	New Zealand	5	(1)
- * Club domestic league appearances and goals

Johan Verweij is a former football (soccer) player who represented New Zealand at international level.

== Playing career ==
Verweij made his full All Whites debut in a 1–0 win over Australia on 13 June 1979 and ended his international playing career with five A-international caps and one goal to his credit, his final cap a substitute appearance in a 2–0 win over Ghana on 7 June 1983.

Verweij played youth football in his father's country, the Netherlands in the mid 1970s and won the Dutch Youth Cup with Feyenoord. Verweij won the New Zealand national football competition three times and the national cup competition, the Chatham Cup. twice with Christchurch United.
