= Ron Tilsed =

Australian association football manager

Personal information
- Date of birth: 6 August 1952 (age 74)
- Place of birth: Weymouth, Dorset, England
- Position: Goalkeeper

Youth career
- Bournemouth & Boscombe

Senior career*
Years	Team	Apps	(Gls)
1970–1972	Bournemouth & Boscombe	2	(0)
1972	Chesterfield	16	(0)
1972–1973	Arsenal	0	(0)
1973–1974	Portsmouth	14	(0)
1974–?	Hereford United	0	(0)
- Rangers (Johannesburg)
1977–1978	Canberra City	41	(0)
1984	Wollongong City	13	(0)

International career
1971	England Youth	7	(0)
- * Club domestic league appearances and goals

Ronald William Tilsed (born 6 August 1952) is an English former footballer and manager.

== Playing career ==
=== Club career ===
Tilsed began his career with Bournemouth & Boscombe as an apprentice, making two appearances before moving to Chesterfield in 1972. After 16 appearances, Tilsed was signed by Arsenal. After six months and no first team appearances, Tilsed transferred to Portsmouth. He played 14 times for Portsmouth before transferring to Hereford United where he only played a handful of pre-season matches before moving on. He spent time at South African club Rangers before emigrating to Australia.

Tilsed was Canberra City's first ever signing and made his debut on their first game in the National Soccer League (NSL) on 4 April 1977. In 1984, Tilsed played 13 matches in the NSL for Wollongong City.

=== International career ===
Tilsed was a member of the England national under-18 football team that won the 1971 UEFA European Under-18 Championship.
