= Brian Stoddart =

Australian academic

Emeritus professor Brian Stoddart is an Australian academic who was the vice-chancellor of La Trobe University between 2005 and 2006. He is a well-known commentator on sporting matters, being involved in the foundation of the Australian Institute of Sport and being the author of many books exploring the history and importance of sports in society.

Stoddart's latest book, published in July 2025, was Playing the Game – How Cricket Made Barbados. In a review for Newtown Review of Books, Bernard Whimpress described it as "important work and essential reading for anyone who cares not only about the direction of West Indies cricket but the future of the global game".
