= Richard Wilson (footballer, born 1956) =

New Zealand footballer

Personal information
- Full name: Richard H. Wilson
- Date of birth: 8 May 1956 (age 70)
- Place of birth: Nelson, New Zealand
- Height: 1.85 m (6 ft 1 in)
- Position: Goalkeeper

Senior career*
Years	Team	Apps	(Gls)
1974–1978	Woolston WMC		
1979	Nelson United	21	(0)
1980–1981	Canberra City	30	(0)
1981–1985	Preston Makedonia	67	(0)
1986–1987	Mount Maunganui		
1987	Grantham Town	7	(0)
1987–1988	Lincoln City	10	(0)
1988–1989	Kettering Town	0	(0)
- Woolston WMC
1999	Rangers AFC	1	(0)
- Avon United

International career
1979–1984	New Zealand	26	(0)
- * Club domestic league appearances and goals

Richard Hardie Wilson (born 8 May 1956) is a retired New Zealand association football player, who was a goalkeeper during the country's first successful campaign to qualify for the FIFA World Cup, in 1982. His international career spanned from 1979 to 1984, and he played in the National Soccer League in Australia until 1989. He returned to New Zealand in 1996 and was player-coach of minor-league side Avon United.

Despite being the only goalkeeper used during the 1982 World Cup qualifying campaign, he was replaced as starting goalkeeper for the finals tournament in Spain by Frank van Hattum. For a considerable time, Wilson held the record for most minutes without conceding a goal by a goalkeeper in any FIFA World Cup qualifying or finals tournament, having not conceded a goal in 921 minutes of football, including matches against Fiji (twice), Chinese Taipei (twice), Indonesia (twice), China (twice) and Australia (once).

His record clean sheet came to a dramatic end during a World Cup home qualifying fixture against Kuwait. Kuwait were controversially awarded a penalty by the Indonesian referee. Wilson spectacularly saved the spot kick only to have a further penalty awarded against New Zealand 10 minutes later. The second penalty found the back of the net bringing to an end Wilson's record. The taking of the second penalty was delayed for some minutes after an irate fan ran onto the field to remonstrate with the referee.
