= Ian Gibson (footballer, born February 1956) =

Scottish footballer (born 1956)

Personal information
- Date of birth: 3 February 1956 (age 70)
- Position: Striker

Senior career*
Years	Team	Apps	(Gls)
?–1975	Nairn County		
1975–1978	Aberdeen	12	(4)
1978–1981	Kilmarnock	70	(12)
1981–1986	Canberra City	137	(28)
- * Club domestic league appearances and goals

Ian Gibson (born 3 February 1956) is a Scottish former footballer, who played as a striker.

== Football career ==
Gibson began his professional career at the Scottish Highland League club Nairn County. He then moved to Aberdeen in 1975, making his debut in the 2–0 win over Dumbarton. He remained there for a further three seasons, until he moved to Kilmarnock in 1978. Gibson made seventy appearances for Kilmarnock, scoring twelve goals. Gibson played in the Australian National Soccer League (NSL) for Canberra City between 1981 and 1986, scoring 28 times in 137 appearances.

== Career after football ==
A graduate of the Aberdeen University, he moved to Australia in 1981 where he began a career in teaching. For nine years he worked at the Academy of Interactive Entertainment as head of school. He now lives in Canberra, Australia.
