= Steve Potter (footballer) =

English footballer

Personal information
- Full name: Steve Potter
- Date of birth: 1 October 1955 (age 71)
- Place of birth: Belper, England
- Position: Goalkeeper

Youth career
- Manchester City

Senior career*
Years	Team	Apps	(Gls)
1974–1978	Swansea City	118	(0)
1978	Bridgend Town	0	(0)
1979–1981	Footscray JUST	28	(0)
1982–1984	Preston Makedonia	34	(0)
Total		180	(0)
- * Club domestic league appearances and goals

Stephen Derek Potter (born 1 October 1955) is a former footballer. He was apprenticed at age 15 with Manchester City Football Club. Potter transferred to Swansea City and made 118 appearances as a goalkeeper for Swansea City between 1974 and 1978 before moving to Bridgend Town in July 1978. After a short stint with Bridgend to maintain fitness, Steve moved to Vancouver, Canada, to play for the Vancouver White Caps Football Club in the then bourgening North American League. He received an offer to play for a Melbourne club and subsequently emigrated to Australia. Potter retired in the early 1980s and now lives in Queensland.
