= Steve Hogg =

Australian soccer player

Personal information
- Full name: Steven Hogg
- Date of birth: 14 February 1960 (age 66)
- Position: Defender

Senior career*
| Years | Team | Apps | (Gls) |
| 1977–1979 | Canberra City | 48 | (0) |
| 1980–1983 | Brisbane Lions | 108 | (9) |
| 1984 | Canberra City | 17 | (0) |
| 1986 | Brisbane City | 9 | (0) |
| Total | | 182 | (9) |

International career
| 1980 | Australia | 4 | (0) |
- * Club domestic league appearances and goals

Steven Hogg (born 14 February 1960) is an Australian former soccer player who played at both professional and international levels as a defender.

== Early and personal life ==
He was educated at the Anglican Church Grammar School.

His daughter, Kahlia has played national league soccer in Australia and the United States.

== Career ==
Hogg played at club level for Canberra City, Brisbane Lions and Brisbane City.

He also earned four caps for Australia in 1980.
