= Josip Picioane =

Romanian-born Australian soccer player

Joe Picioane
Personal information
- Full name: Josip Picioane
- Date of birth: 17 February 1953
- Place of birth: Pitești, Romania
- Height: 1.77 m (5 ft 10 in)
- Position: Midfielder

Youth career
- Footscray JUST

Senior career*
Years	Team	Apps	(Gls)
1977–1978	Footscray JUST		
- Melbourne Slavia
- Waverley City
- Melbourne Hakoah
- Westgate

International career
1978–1979	Australia	3	(0)
- * Club domestic league appearances and goals

Josip Picioane (born 17 February 1953) is a retired Australian football (soccer) player.

Picioane was born in Romania.

He was commonly called "Joe", and played club football for Westgate, Melbourne Hakoah, Waverley City, Melbourne Slavia and Footscray JUST.

Picioane played one international match for Australia in 1978, and played in two other games for the national team.

His son Lance is a former Australian rules footballer.
