= Peter Ollerton =

English-born Australian soccer player

Personal information
- Date of birth: 20 May 1951 (age 75)
- Place of birth: Preston, Lancashire, England
- Position: Striker

Youth career
- Preston North End
- Blackpool

Senior career*
Years	Team	Apps	(Gls)
1968–1971	Fleetwood	107	(42)
1971–1973	Ringwood Wilhelmina	46	(33)
1974–1975	APIA Leichhardt	45	(35)
1976–1978	South Melbourne Hellas	54	(23)
1978	Marconi-Fairfield	13	(3)
1979–1980	Footscray JUST	35	(7)
1981–1984	Preston Makedonia	81	(24)
1985–1986	Croydon City Arrows SC	27	(4)

International career
1974–1977	Australia	31	(15)

Managerial career
- 1981–1984: Preston Lions (Player Coach)
- 1985–1986: Croydon City (Player Coach)
- 1987: Melbourne Croatia
- 1994–1995: Preston Lions
- 1995–1996: Bulleen Lions
- 1999–2000: Altona East Phoenix
- 2001–2002: Heidelberg United
- 2002: Bulleen Zebras
- 2003: Altona East Phoenix
- 2003–2005: Bulleen Zebras
- 2007–2008: Whittlesea Zebras
- 2009–2010: Green Gully
- * Club domestic league appearances and goals

Peter Ollerton (born 20 May 1951 in Preston, Lancashire, England is a former Australian soccer forward who represented Australia 31 times in full international matches between 1974 and 1977, scoring 15 goals. He was a member of the Australian 1974 World Cup squad in West Germany and also represented the state of Victoria.

== Playing career ==
=== Club career ===
After playing youth football for Blackpool and Preston North End, Ollerton played for Fleetwood.

Ollerton joined Ringwood Wilhelmina in 1971.

After three seasons with Ringwood Wilhelmina, Ollerton joined APIA Leichhardt.

In late 1975, Ollerton transferred from APIA Leichhardt to South Melbourne Hellas for a $9000 transfer fee.

In 1988, Ollerton was suspended for ten years for punching a referee while playing for Doveton in the Victorian second division. In 1991, the ban was eased and he returned to coaching Preston Makedonia in 1994.

=== International career ===
Ollerton made his debut for Australia in 1974 in a pre-World Cup friendly against Uruguay.

== Coaching career ==
Ollerton became playing coach of Preston Makedonia in June 1981, replacing Brian Edgley. He was sacked by the club midway through the 1984 season.

In September 1984, Ollerton was announced as coach of Croydon City.

Ahead of the 1987 National Soccer League season, Ollerton joined Melbourne Croatia as an assistant coach. He became caretaker head coach with the resignation and reinstatement of head coach Terry Hennessey in May 1987. He was appointed head coach after Hennessey resigned for the second time.

Ollerton led Preston to the 1994 Victorian Premier League grand final, where they defeated Port Melbourne to win the championship.

== Career statistics ==
=== International ===
As of end of 1977

Appearances and goals by national team and year
National team	Year	Apps	Goals
Australia	1974	6	1
Australia	1975	4	2
Australia	1976	6	4
Australia	1977	15	8

List of international goals scored by Peter Ollerton
No.	Date	Venue	Opponent	Score	Result	Competition	Ref.
1	27 April 1974	Sydney Cricket Ground, Sydney, Australia	Uruguay	2–0	2–0	Friendly	
2	30 November 1975	Sydney Sports Ground, Sydney, Australia	Soviet Union	1–0	2–3	Friendly	
3	3 December 1975	Newcastle Showground, Newcastle, Australia	Soviet Union	1–1	1–1	Friendly	
4	2 March 1976	Olympic Park Stadium, Melbourne, Australia	New Zealand	2–0	3–1	Friendly	
5	20 October 1976	Singapore National Stadium, Singapore	Singapore	1–0	1–0	Friendly	
6	29 October 1976	Guangzhou, China	China	1–0	2–0	Friendly	
7	29 October 1976	Guangzhou, China	China	2–0	2–0	Friendly	
8	12 February 1977	Olympic Park Stadium, Melbourne, Australia	Israel	1–1	1–1	Friendly	
9	27 March 1977	Sydney Cricket Ground, Sydney, Australia	New Zealand	2–1	3–1	1978 FIFA World Cup qualification (AFC and OFC)	
10	27 March 1977	Sydney Cricket Ground, Sydney, Australia	New Zealand	3–1	3–1	1978 FIFA World Cup qualification (AFC and OFC)	
11	30 March 1977	Newmarket Park, Auckland, New Zealand	New Zealand	1–0	1–1	1978 FIFA World Cup qualification (AFC and OFC)	
12	30 October 1977	Hong Kong Stadium, Hong Kong	Hong Kong	1–0	5–2	1978 FIFA World Cup qualification (AFC and OFC)	
13	30 October 1977	Hong Kong Stadium, Hong Kong	Hong Kong	2–0	5–2	1978 FIFA World Cup qualification (AFC and OFC)	
14	30 October 1977	Hong Kong Stadium, Hong Kong	Hong Kong	3–0	5–2	1978 FIFA World Cup qualification (AFC and OFC)	
15	13 November 1977	Singapore National Stadium, Singapore	Singapore	1–0	2–0	Friendly	

== Honours ==
=== Player ===
Croydon City

- Victorian Premier League champion: 1985

=== Coach ===
Croydon City

- Victorian Premier League champion: 1985

Bulleen Zebras

- Victorian Premier League champion: 2004

=== Individual ===
- Soccer Australia Hall of Fame: 2002
- Victorian Premier League Coach of the Year: 2000, 2004
