= 1981 Marconi Fairfield FC season =

Marconi Fairfield
1981 season
- Head Coach: Raul Blanco (until 10 August); Luciano Nesti (caretaker, from 10 August)
- Stadium: Marconi Stadium
- National Soccer League: 14th
- NSL Cup: Semi-finals
- Charity Shield: Winners
- Top goalscorer: League: Mark Jankovics; Peter Sharne (6 each); All: Mark Jankovics (10)
- Highest home attendance: 7,319 vs. Sydney Olympic (19 July 1981); National Soccer League
- Lowest home attendance: 2,000 vs. Canterbury Marickville (6 May 1981); NSL Cup
- Average home league attendance: 3,683
- Biggest win: 3–1 vs. Heidelberg United (19 April 1981); National Soccer League; 2–0 vs. Blacktown City (10 May 1981); National Soccer League; 3–1 vs. APIA Leichhardt (8 July 1981); NSL Cup
- Biggest defeat: 0–5 vs. Sydney City (15 March 1981); National Soccer League

The 1981 season was the fifth in the National Soccer League for Marconi Fairfield (now Marconi Stallions Football Club). In addition to the domestic league, they also participated in the NSL Cup. Marconi Fairfield finished 14th in their National Soccer League season, and were eliminated in the semi-finals of the NSL Cup.

== Players ==
Note: Flags indicate national team as defined under FIFA eligibility rules; some limited exceptions apply. Players may hold more than one non-FIFA nationality.

No.	Pos.	Nation	Player
1	GK	AUS	Allan Maher
2	DF	AUS	Peter Brogan
3	DF	AUS	Paul Degney
4	DF	AUS	Tony Henderson
5	DF	AUS	Ivo Prskalo
6	MF	AUS	Gary Byrne (captain)
7	FW	AUS	Peter Sharne
9	FW	AUS	Eddie Krncevic
10	FW	AUS	Berti Mariani
11	FW	AUS	Ian Hunter
12	DF	AUS	Stuart Johnston

No.	Pos.	Nation	Player
13	FW	AUS	Jim Muir
14	FW	AUS	Mark Jankovics
15	DF	AUS	Dennis Colusso
16	DF	AUS	Drago Tomasich
17	MF	AUS	Josip Picioane
19	DF	AUS	Steve Calderan
22	GK	AUS	Ron Corry
—	MF	AUS	Attilio Carbone
—		AUS	Dennis Morson
—	MF	AUS	Peter Raskopoulos

== Competitions ==
=== Overall record ===
Competition	First match	Last match	Starting round	Final position	Record							
Competition	First match	Last match	Starting round	Final position	Pld	W	D	L	GF	GA	GD	Win %
National Soccer League	15 February 1981	13 September 1981	Matchday 1	14th	30	9	7	14	23	45	−22	30.00
NSL Cup	29 March 1981	5 August 1981	First round	Semi-finals	5	3	1	1	10	7	+3	60.00
Charity Shield	30 January 1981		Final	Winners	1	1	0	0	3	1	+2	100.00
Total					36	13	8	15	36	53	−17	36.11

Source: Competitions

=== National Soccer League ===
==== League table ====
Pos	Team	Pld	W	D	L	GF	GA	GD	Pts	Relegation
1	Sydney City (C)	30	19	5	6	59	30	+29	43	
2	South Melbourne	30	13	13	4	41	27	+14	39	
3	Brisbane City	30	12	11	7	37	25	+12	35	
4	APIA Leichhardt	30	12	11	7	39	33	+6	35	
5	Canberra City	30	13	7	10	41	32	+9	33	
6	Brisbane Lions	30	11	11	8	41	33	+8	33	
7	Adelaide City	30	13	6	11	46	42	+4	32	
8	Heidelberg United	30	12	7	11	48	40	+8	31	
9	Sydney Olympic	30	11	9	10	46	46	0	31	
10	Newcastle KB United	30	11	8	11	41	41	0	30	
11	Wollongong City	30	8	12	10	35	39	−4	28	
12	Preston Makedonia	30	9	7	14	39	41	−2	25	
13	Footscray JUST	30	9	7	14	32	48	−16	25	
14	Marconi Fairfield	30	9	7	14	23	45	−22	25	
15	Blacktown City (R)	30	6	9	15	32	47	−15	21	Relegated to the 1982 NSW State League
16	West Adelaide	30	5	4	21	26	57	−31	14	

Updated to match(es) played on unknown. Source: rsssf.com
Rules for classification: 1) points; 2) goal difference; 3) number of goals scored.
(C) Champions; (R) Relegated

==== Results summary ====
Overall								Home						Away					
Pld	W	D	L	GF	GA	GD	Pts	W	D	L	GF	GA	GD	W	D	L	GF	GA	GD
30	9	7	14	23	45	−22	34	6	3	6	16	20	−4	3	4	8	7	25	−18

Source: worldfootball.net

==== Results by round ====
Round	1	2	3	4	5	10	6	7	8	9	11	12	13	15	16	17	18	19	20	21	22	24	25	26	23	27	28	29	14	30
Ground	A	H	A	H	A	A	H	H	A	H	H	A	H	H	A	H	A	H	A	A	H	H	A	H	A	A	H	A	A	H
Result	L	W	W	D	L	W	L	W	L	W	W	W	L	D	D	L	L	W	D	L	W	L	L	L	D	L	L	L	D	D
Position	12	8	6	6	9	7	10	8	10	9	7	6	7	7	7	8	10	10	10	10	10	10	10	12	10	12	14	14	6	14
Points	0	2	4	5	5	7	7	9	9	11	13	15	15	16	17	17	17	19	20	20	22	22	22	22	23	23	23	23	24	25

Source: worldfootball.net
A = Away; H = Home; W = Win; D = Draw; L = Loss

==== Matches ====
Win Draw Loss

15 February 1981 1	South Melbourne	1–0	Marconi Fairfield	Melbourne
	Evans 39'	Report		Stadium: Middle Park Soccer Stadium; Attendance: 5,500; Referee: Chris Bambridge

22 February 1981 2	Marconi Fairfield	1–0	Preston Makedonia	Sydney
	Krncevic 66'	Report		Stadium: Marconi Oval; Attendance: 4,500; Referee: Gary Power

1 March 1981 3	Adelaide City	0–1	Marconi Fairfield	Adelaide
		Report	Jankovics 63'	Stadium: Hindmarsh Stadium; Attendance: 2,300; Referee: Don Campbell

8 March 1981 4	Marconi Fairfield	1–1	Brisbane City	Sydney
16:00 AEST	Byrne 68'	Report	McVeigh 25'	Stadium: Marconi Oval; Attendance: 3,420; Referee: Tony Boskovic

15 March 1981 5	Sydney City	5–0	Marconi Fairfield	Sydney
	Boden 10', 11', 73'; Gomez 85', 90'	Report		Stadium: ES Marks Athletics Field; Attendance: 3,458; Referee: Tim Davies

22 March 1981 10	Footscray JUST	1–2	Marconi Fairfield	Melbourne
	Ilioski 71'	Report	Sharne 62'; Muir 80'	Stadium: Schintler Reserve; Attendance: 2,000; Referee: Jim Fearn

29 March 1981 6	Marconi Fairfield	0–2	Canberra City	Sydney
15:00 AEST		Report	Valeri 61', 86' (pen.)	Stadium: Marconi Oval; Attendance: 3,700; Referee: Ken Small

5 April 1981 7	Marconi Fairfield	1–0	West Adelaide	Sydney
	Sharne 78'	Report		Stadium: Marconi Oval; Attendance: 3,550; Referee: Richard Lorenc

12 April 1981 8	Sydney Olympic	2–0	Marconi Fairfield	Sydney
	Katholos 72'; Cotton 79'	Report		Stadium: Pratten Park; Attendance: 6,878; Referee: Tony Boskovic

19 April 1981 9	Marconi Fairfield	3–1	Heidelberg United	Sydney
15:00 AEST	Sharne 10', 38'; Jankovics 90'	Report	Yzendoorn 60'	Stadium: Marconi Oval; Attendance: 2,500; Referee: Peter Rampley

3 May 1981 11	Marconi Fairfield	2–1	Brisbane Lions	Sydney
15:00 AEST	Johnston 47'; Sharne 75'	Report	Hermiston 40'	Stadium: Marconi Stadium; Attendance: 2,225; Referee: Ken Small

10 May 1981 12	Blacktown City	0–2	Marconi Fairfield	Sydney
		Report	Picioane 61'; Sharne 88'	Stadium: Gabbie Stadium; Attendance: 3,180; Referee: Tony Boskovic

17 May 1981 13	Marconi Fairfield	1–2	Newcastle KB United	Sydney
	Byrne 79'	Report	Mountford 16'; Senkalski 80'	Stadium: Marconi Stadium; Attendance: 2,603; Referee: Richard Lorenc

31 May 1981 15	Marconi Fairfield	1–1	Wollongong City	Sydney
15:00 AEST	Krncevic 43'	Report	Adam 21'	Stadium: Marconi Stadium; Attendance: 2,400; Referee: Henry Witschge

7 June 1981 16	Preston Makedonia	0–0	Marconi Fairfield	Melbourne
		Report		Stadium: B.T. Connor Reserve; Referee: Jack Johnston

14 June 1981 17	Marconi Fairfield	1–4	Adelaide City	Sydney
15:00 AEST	Jankovics 50'	Report	Mitchell 1'; Villani 20'; Marocchi 39'; Northcote 45'	Stadium: Marconi Stadium; Attendance: 3,241; Referee: Tim Davies

21 June 1981 18	Brisbane City	4–0	Marconi Fairfield	Brisbane
	Vincenzino 52'; P. Wilkinson 62'; Gaffney 69'; Caldwell 71' (pen.)	Report		Stadium: Spencer Park; Attendance: 2,500; Referee: Alf Rodway

28 June 1981 19	Marconi Fairfield	1–0	Sydney City	Sydney
	Jankovics 58'	Report		Stadium: Marconi Stadium; Attendance: 6,165; Referee: Barry Harwood

5 July 1981 20	Canberra City	0–0	Marconi Fairfield	Canberra
		Report		Stadium: Bruce Stadium; Attendance: 4,160; Referee: Bob Mee

12 July 1981 21	West Adelaide	2–0	Marconi Fairfield	Adelaide
	Lorenzoni 52', 73'	Report		Stadium: Hindmarsh Stadium; Attendance: 3,562; Referee: Graham Neal

19 July 1981 22	Marconi Fairfield	2–1	Sydney Olympic	Sydney
	Johnston 29'; Jankovics 56'	Report	Katholos 84'	Stadium: Marconi Stadium; Attendance: 7,319; Referee: Gary Power

2 August 1981 24	Marconi Fairfield	1–3	Footscray JUST	Sydney
	Jankovics 79'	Report	Verweij 7'; Cozzella 47'; Lujic 84'	Stadium: Marconi Stadium; Attendance: 3,450; Referee: Richard Lorenc

9 August 1981 25	Brisbane Lions	2–0	Marconi Fairfield	Brisbane
	Ferris 28'; Williamson 48'	Report		Stadium: Richlands Stadium; Attendance: 2,000; Referee: Dave Nugent

16 August 1981 26	Marconi Fairfield	0–1	Blacktown City	Sydney
		Report	O'Donnell 69'	Stadium: Marconi Stadium; Attendance: 2,100; Referee: Doug Rennie

19 August 1981 23	Heidelberg United	1–1	Marconi Fairfield	Melbourne
	Yzendoorn 39'	Report	Krncevic 81'	Stadium: Olympic Park; Attendance: 3,000; Referee: Chris Bambridge

23 August 1981 27	Newcastle KB United	2–0	Marconi Fairfield	Newcastle
	Mountford 26'; Sumner 59'	Report		Stadium: Newcastle International Sports Centre; Attendance: 5,027; Referee: Peter Rampley

30 August 1981 28	Marconi Fairfield	0–2	APIA Leichhardt	Sydney
15:00 AEST		Report	Soper 23', 74'	Stadium: Marconi Stadium; Attendance: 5,325; Referee: Tim Davies

6 September 1981 29	Wollongong City	4–0	Marconi Fairfield	Wollongong
	McBreen 60'; Tredinnick 74'; Lathan 79', 89'	Report		Stadium: Wollongong Showground; Attendance: 5,819; Referee: Tony Boskovic

9 September 1981 14	APIA Leichhardt	1–1	Marconi Fairfield	Sydney
	Soper 20'	Report	Mariani 75'	Stadium: Leichhardt Oval; Attendance: 4,248; Referee: Stewart Mellings

13 September 1981 30	Marconi Fairfield	1–1	South Melbourne	Sydney
	Krncevic 50'	Report	Buljevic 42'	Stadium: Marconi Stadium; Attendance: 2,745; Referee: Don Campbell

=== NSL Cup ===
Win Draw Loss

29 March 1981 First round	Marconi Fairfield	2–1	Melita Eagles	Sydney
	Jankovics 15', 62'	Report	Allan 51'	Stadium: Everley Park; Attendance: Referee: Gary Power

6 May 1981 Second round	Marconi Fairfield	1–0	Canterbury Marickville	Sydney
	Byrne 62'	Report		Stadium: Marconi Oval; Attendance: 2,000; Referee: Arthur Owens

27 May 1981 Third round	Marconi Fairfield	2–2 (a.e.t.) (5–4 p)	Sydney City	Sydney
	Sharne ?'; Krncevic ?'	Report	Boden 46', ?'	Stadium: Marconi Oval; Referee: Richard Lorenc

8 July 1981 Quarter-finals	APIA Leichhardt	1–3	Marconi Fairfield	Sydney
	Morsello 65'	Report	Krncevic 12', 63', 89'	Stadium: St George Stadium; Attendance: 3,800; Referee: Henry Witschge

5 August 1981 Semi-finals	Marconi Fairfield	2–3	Brisbane Lions	Sydney
	Jankovics ?', ?'	Report	Bennett 46'; Williamson 59', 62'	Stadium: Marconi Oval; Attendance: 3,200; Referee: Peter Rampley

=== Charity Shield ===
Marconi Fairfield, as NSL Cup winners in the previous season, played against Sydney City who won the National Soccer League in the previous season in the 1981 Charity Shield.

30 January 1981 Final	Sydney City	1–3 (a.e.t.)	Marconi Fairfield	Sydney
	Kosmina ?'	Report	Cant 90' (o.g.); Sharne ?', ?'	Stadium: Redfern Oval; Attendance: 3,500; Referee: Henry Witschge

== Statistics ==
=== Appearances and goals ===
Includes all competitions. Players with no appearances not included in the list.

No.	Pos.	Nat.	Player	National Soccer League		NSL Cup		Charity Shield		Total	
No.	Pos.	Nat.	Player	Apps	Goals	Apps	Goals	Apps	Goals	Apps	Goals
1	GK	(Australia)	Allan Maher	24	0	4	0	1	0	29	0
2	DF	(Australia)	Peter Brogan	22	0	5	0	1	0	28	0
3	DF	(Australia)	Paul Degney	25	0	5	0	0	0	30	0
4	DF	(Australia)	Tony Henderson	27+1	0	4	0	1	0	33	0
5	DF	(Australia)	Ivo Prskalo	16	0	2+1	0	1	0	20	0
6	MF	(Australia)	Gary Byrne	29	2	5	1	1	0	35	3
7	FW	(Australia)	Peter Sharne	29+1	6	4+1	1	1	2	36	9
9	FW	(Australia)	Eddie Krncevic	27+1	4	3	4	1	0	32	8
10	FW	(Australia)	Berti Mariani	25+1	1	5	0	1	0	32	1
11	FW	(Australia)	Ian Hunter	6+3	0	2	0	0	0	11	0
12	DF	(Australia)	Stuart Johnston	8+5	2	2+2	0	0	0	17	2
13	FW	(Australia)	Jim Muir	8+3	0	0+1	0	1	0	13	0
14	FW	(Australia)	Mark Jankovics	29+1	6	5	4	0	0	35	10
15	DF	(Australia)	Dennis Colusso	5+7	0	1	0	0+1	0	14	0
16	DF	(Australia)	Drago Tomasich	11+2	0	0	0	1	0	14	0
17	MF	(Australia)	Josip Picioane	8+3	1	0	0	0	0	11	1
19	DF	(Australia)	Steve Calderan	4+1	0	1	0	0	0	6	0
22	GK	(Australia)	Ron Corry	6	0	1	0	0	0	7	0
—	MF	(Australia)	Attilio Carbone	2+1	0	0	0	0	0	3	0
—	—	(Australia)	Dennis Morson	0+1	0	0	0	0	0	1	0
—	MF	(Australia)	Peter Raskopoulos	5	0	0	0	1	0	6	0
Player(s) transferred out but featured this season
8	MF	(Iran)	Hussein Housseini	15+2	0	5	0	0	0	22	0
15	MF	(Australia)	Ken Lindsay	0	0	0	0	0+1	0	1	0

=== Disciplinary record ===
Includes all competitions. The list is sorted by squad number when total cards are equal. Players with no cards not included in the list.

Rank	No.	Pos.	Nat.	Player	National Soccer League			NSL Cup			Charity Shield			Total		
Rank	No.	Pos.	Nat.	Player	Yellow card	Second yellow card	Red card	Yellow card	Second yellow card	Red card	Yellow card	Second yellow card	Red card	Yellow card	Second yellow card	Red card
1	5	DF	(Australia)	Ivo Prskalo	1	0	1	1	0	0	0	0	0	2	0	1
1	8	MF	(Iran)	Hussein Housseini	2	0	1	0	0	0	0	0	0	2	0	1
3	19	DF	(Australia)	Steve Calderan	0	0	0	1	0	1	0	0	0	1	0	1
4	4	DF	(Australia)	Tony Henderson	5	0	0	1	0	0	0	0	0	6	0	0
5	6	MF	(Australia)	Gary Byrne	4	0	0	1	0	0	0	0	0	5	0	0
6	13	FW	(Australia)	Jim Muir	3	0	0	0	0	0	0	0	0	3	0	0
7	1	GK	(Australia)	Allan Maher	1	0	0	1	0	0	0	0	0	2	0	0
7	2	DF	(Australia)	Peter Brogan	1	0	0	1	0	0	0	0	0	2	0	0
7	10	FW	(Australia)	Berti Mariani	1	0	0	1	0	0	0	0	0	2	0	0
7	14	FW	(Australia)	Mark Jankovics	2	0	0	0	0	0	0	0	0	2	0	0
7	16	DF	(Australia)	Drago Tomasich	2	0	0	0	0	0	0	0	0	2	0	0
12	3	DF	(Australia)	Paul Degney	0	0	0	1	0	0	0	0	0	1	0	0
12	17	MF	(Australia)	Josip Picioane	1	0	0	0	0	0	0	0	0	1	0	0
Total					23	0	2	8	0	1	0	0	0	31	0	3

=== Clean sheets ===
Includes all competitions. The list is sorted by squad number when total clean sheets are equal. Numbers in parentheses represent games where both goalkeepers participated and both kept a clean sheet; the number in parentheses is awarded to the goalkeeper who was substituted on, whilst a full clean sheet is awarded to the goalkeeper who was on the field at the start of play. Goalkeepers with no clean sheets not included in the list.

Rank	No.	Nat.	Goalkeeper	NSL	NSL Cup	Charity Shield	Total
1	1	(Australia)	Allan Maher	7	1	0	8
Total				7	1	0	8
