= 1982 Marconi Fairfield FC season =

Marconi Fairfield
1982 season
- Head Coach: Dom Kapetanovic
- Stadium: Marconi Stadium
- National Soccer League: 10th
- NSL Cup: Quarter-finals
- Top goalscorer: League: Mark Jankovics (12); All: Mark Jankovics (13)
- Highest home attendance: 10,812 vs. Sydney Olympic (11 April 1982); National Soccer League
- Lowest home attendance: 1,055 vs. APIA Leichhardt (14 July 1982); NSL Cup
- Average home league attendance: 3,511
- Biggest win: 7–1 vs. APIA Leichhardt (H) (6 June 1982); National Soccer League
- Biggest defeat: 1–4 vs. Preston Makedonia (A) (1 August 1982); National Soccer League
Home colours

The 1982 season was the sixth in the National Soccer League for Marconi Fairfield Football Club (now Marconi Stallions). In addition to the domestic league, they also participated in the NSL Cup. Marconi Fairfield finished 10th in their National Soccer League season, and were eliminated in the quarter-finals of the NSL Cup.

== Players ==
Note: Flags indicate national team as defined under FIFA eligibility rules; some limited exceptions apply. Players may hold more than one non-FIFA nationality.

| No. | Pos. | Nation | Player |
|---|---|---|---|
| 1 | GK | AUS | Allan Maher (captain) |
| 2 | DF | AUS | Vic Bozanic |
| 3 | DF | AUS | Ricky Budini |
| 4 | DF | AUS | Tony Henderson (vice-captain) |
| 5 | DF | AUS | Ivo Prskalo |
| 6 | DF | AUS | Steve Calderan |
| 7 | FW | YUG | Jovan Djordjevic |
| 8 | MF | AUS | Attilio Carbone |
| 9 | FW | ITA | Roberto Vieri |
| 10 | GK | AUS | Dennis Colusso |
| 11 | MF | AUS | Rene Licata |
| 12 | FW | BRA | Hilton Silva |

| No. | Pos. | Nation | Player |
|---|---|---|---|
| 13 | FW | AUS | Berti Mariani |
| 14 | FW | AUS | Mark Jankovics |
| 15 | DF | AUS | Tom McCulloch |
| 16 | MF | AUS | Josip Picioane |
| 17 | FW | AUS | Ian Hunter |
| 18 | | AUS | Nikola Duvnjak |
| 20 | GK | AUS | Tony Veneri |
| — | DF | AUS | Paul Degney |
| — | MF | YUG | Dubravko Ledic |
| — | DF | AUS | Joe Rizzotto |
| — | FW | AUS | Peter Sharne |
| — | MF | AUS | Marcos Silva |

== Competitions ==
=== Overall record ===
| Competition | First match | Last match | Starting round | Final position | Record | | | | | | | |
| Competition | First match | Last match | Starting round | Final position | Pld | W | D | L | GF | GA | GD | Win % |
|---|---|---|---|---|---|---|---|---|---|---|---|---|
| National Soccer League | 14 February 1982 | 5 September 1982 | Matchday 1 | 10th | 30 | 12 | 4 | 14 | 44 | 43 | +1 | 40.00 |
| NSL Cup | 14 June 1982 | 14 July 1982 | First round | Quarter-finals | 2 | 0 | 1 | 1 | 3 | 4 | −1 | 0.00 |
| Total | | | | | 32 | 12 | 5 | 15 | 47 | 47 | +0 | 37.50 |

Source: Competitions

=== National Soccer League ===
==== League table ====
| Pos | Team | Pld | W | D | L | GF | GA | GD | Pts | Relegation |
|---|---|---|---|---|---|---|---|---|---|---|
| 1 | Sydney City (C) | 30 | 20 | 5 | 5 | 68 | 28 | +40 | 45 | Qualification to Finals series (Note: The Finals series was not considered the championship for the 1982 National Soccer League.) |
| 2 | St George-Budapest | 30 | 14 | 8 | 8 | 47 | 40 | +7 | 36 | Qualification to Finals series |
| 3 | Wollongong City | 30 | 16 | 3 | 11 | 43 | 46 | −3 | 35 | Qualification to Finals series |
| 4 | Heidelberg United | 30 | 13 | 8 | 9 | 42 | 37 | +5 | 34 | Qualification to Finals series |
| 5 | Preston Makedonia | 30 | 12 | 10 | 8 | 45 | 41 | +4 | 34 | |
| 6 | South Melbourne | 30 | 11 | 9 | 10 | 46 | 37 | +9 | 31 | |
| 7 | APIA Leichhardt | 30 | 12 | 7 | 11 | 49 | 54 | −5 | 31 | |
| 8 | Sydney Olympic | 30 | 12 | 6 | 12 | 52 | 42 | +10 | 30 | |
| 9 | West Adelaide | 30 | 10 | 8 | 12 | 44 | 40 | +4 | 28 | |
| 10 | Marconi Fairfield | 30 | 12 | 4 | 14 | 44 | 43 | +1 | 28 | |
| 11 | Brisbane Lions | 30 | 10 | 8 | 12 | 39 | 42 | −3 | 28 | |
| 12 | Newcastle KB United | 30 | 10 | 7 | 13 | 43 | 52 | −9 | 27 | |
| 13 | Adelaide City | 30 | 6 | 12 | 12 | 36 | 44 | −8 | 24 | |
| 14 | Footscray JUST | 30 | 5 | 14 | 11 | 34 | 46 | −12 | 24 | |
| 15 | Canberra City | 30 | 7 | 10 | 13 | 37 | 54 | −17 | 24 | |
| 16 | Brisbane City | 30 | 5 | 11 | 14 | 32 | 55 | −23 | 21 | |

Source: rsssf.com
Rules for classification: 1) points; 2) goal difference; 3) number of goals scored.
(C) Champions

==== Results summary ====
| Overall | | | | | | | | Home | | | | | | Away | | | | | |
| Pld | W | D | L | GF | GA | GD | Pts | W | D | L | GF | GA | GD | W | D | L | GF | GA | GD |
|---|---|---|---|---|---|---|---|---|---|---|---|---|---|---|---|---|---|---|---|
| 30 | 12 | 4 | 14 | 44 | 43 | +1 | 40 | 8 | 2 | 5 | 32 | 19 | +13 | 4 | 2 | 9 | 12 | 24 | −12 |

Source: worldfootball.net

==== Results by round ====
| Round | 1 | 2 | 3 | 4 | 5 | 6 | 7 | 8 | 9 | 10 | 11 | 12 | 13 | 14 | 15 | 16 | 17 | 18 | 19 | 20 | 21 | 22 | 23 | 24 | 25 | 26 | 27 | 28 | 29 | 30 |
|---|---|---|---|---|---|---|---|---|---|---|---|---|---|---|---|---|---|---|---|---|---|---|---|---|---|---|---|---|---|---|
| Ground | A | H | A | H | A | H | A | H | H | A | H | A | H | A | H | A | H | A | H | A | H | A | A | H | A | H | A | H | A | H |
| Result | L | W | D | D | L | W | L | W | L | W | W | W | W | L | L | L | W | L | L | L | W | D | W | D | L | L | L | L | W | W |
| Position | 14 | 6 | 8 | 8 | 10 | 9 | 10 | 10 | 10 | 10 | 7 | 6 | 5 | 7 | 8 | 7 | 7 | 7 | 9 | 10 | 9 | 10 | 9 | 8 | 10 | 10 | 11 | 12 | 11 | 10 |
| Points | 0 | 2 | 3 | 4 | 4 | 6 | 6 | 8 | 8 | 10 | 12 | 14 | 16 | 16 | 16 | 16 | 18 | 18 | 18 | 18 | 20 | 21 | 23 | 24 | 24 | 24 | 24 | 24 | 26 | 28 |

Source: worldfootball.net
A = Away; H = Home; W = Win; D = Draw; L = Loss

==== Matches ====
Win Draw Loss

| 14 February 1982 1 | APIA Leichhardt | 2–0 | Marconi Fairfield | Sydney |
| | McBreen 41'; Giampaolo 83' | Report | | Stadium: Lambert Park; Attendance: 4,233; Referee: Tony Boskovic |

| 21 February 1982 2 | Marconi Fairfield | 4–0 | Brisbane City | Sydney |
| | Silva 44'; Bozanic 48', 88' (pen.); Jankovics 61' | Report | | Stadium: Marconi Stadium; Attendance: 2,766; Referee: Doug Rennie |

| 28 February 1982 3 | Footscray JUST | 1–1 | Marconi Fairfield | Melbourne |
| | Ilioski 62' | Report | Hunter 75' | Stadium: Schintler Reserve; Attendance: 2,263; Referee: Dennis Voutsinas |

| 7 March 1982 4 | Marconi Fairfield | 2–2 | Canberra City | Sydney |
| | Jankovics 36'; Hunter 81' | Report | T. Byrne ?'; Purdie 65' | Stadium: Marconi Stadium; Attendance: 4,039; Referee: Peter Rampley |

| 13 March 1982 5 | Newcastle KB United | 2–0 | Marconi Fairfield | Newcastle |
| | Lowe 16', 77' | Report | | Stadium: Newcastle International Sports Centre; Attendance: 2,920; Referee: Gary Power |

| 21 March 1982 6 | Marconi Fairfield | 1–0 | Heidelberg United | Sydney |
| | Calderan 11' | Report | | Stadium: Marconi Stadium; Attendance: 2,128; Referee: Richard Lorenc |

| 28 March 1982 7 | St George-Budapest | 2–0 | Marconi Fairfield | Sydney |
| | Marton 62', 87' | Report | | Stadium: St George Stadium; Attendance: 2,892; Referee: Tony Boskovic |

| 4 April 1982 8 | Marconi Fairfield | 1–0 | Adelaide City | Sydney |
| | Henderson 27' | Report | | Stadium: Marconi Stadium; Attendance: 2,281; Referee: Ken Small |

| 11 April 1982 9 | Marconi Fairfield | 2–3 | Sydney Olympic | Sydney |
| | Jankovics 24'; Calderan 80' | Report | Koussas 9'; Redfern 32', ?' (pen.) | Stadium: Marconi Stadium; Attendance: 10,812; Referee: Jim Reeves |

| 18 April 1982 10 | Brisbane Lions | 0–1 | Marconi Fairfield | Brisbane |
| | | Report | Licata 65' | Stadium: Richlands Stadium; Attendance: 1,400; Referee: Dave Nugent |

| 25 April 1982 11 | Marconi Fairfield | 4–1 | Preston Makedonia | Sydney |
| | Hunter 2', ?'; Vieri 30'; Jankovics 79' | Report | Lucchesi 57' | Stadium: Marconi Stadium; Attendance: 2,721; Referee: Brian Fowler |

| 2 May 1982 12 | Wollongong City | 0–3 | Marconi Fairfield | Wollongong |
| | | Report | Jankovics 4'; Bozanic 5'; Licata 56' | Stadium: Wollongong Showground; Attendance: 4,000; Referee: Doug Rennie |

| 9 May 1982 13 | Marconi Fairfield | 2–1 | South Melbourne | Sydney |
| | Bozanic 44' (pen.); Jankovics 62' | Report | Evans 26' | Stadium: Marconi Stadium; Attendance: 3,281; Referee: Peter Rampley |

| 16 May 1982 14 | Sydney City | 3–1 | Marconi Fairfield | Sydney |
| | Kosmina 28', 30', 58' (pen.) | Report | Henderson 73' | Stadium: ES Marks Athletics Field; Attendance: 4,028; Referee: Tim Davies |

| 23 May 1982 15 | Marconi Fairfield | 0–2 | West Adelaide | Sydney |
| | | Report | Dunn ?'; Honeyman 60' | Stadium: Marconi Stadium; Attendance: 2,699; Referee: Gary Power |

| 30 May 1982 16 | Brisbane City | 2–0 | Marconi Fairfield | Brisbane |
| | Glockner 6', 75' | Report | | Stadium: Spencer Park; Attendance: 1,400; Referee: Bill Monteverde |

| 6 June 1982 17 | Marconi Fairfield | 7–1 | APIA Leichhardt | Sydney |
| | Hunter 5'; Jankovics 30', 51'; Bozanic 45' (pen.); Licata 61', 87'; McCulloch 73' | Report | Giampaolo 85' (pen.) | Stadium: Marconi Stadium; Attendance: 7,863; Referee: Ken Small |

| 13 June 1982 18 | Canberra City | 2–0 | Marconi Fairfield | Canberra |
| | T. Byrne 58'; Stone 63' | Report | | Stadium: Bruce Stadium; Attendance: 2,000; Referee: Ken Small |

| 20 June 1982 19 | Marconi Fairfield | 0–2 | Footscray JUST | Sydney |
| | | Report | Simic 8', 72' | Stadium: Marconi Stadium; Attendance: 2,322; Referee: Doug Rennie |

| 27 June 1982 20 | Heidelberg United | 2–1 | Marconi Fairfield | Melbourne |
| | Selemidis 16'; Paton 88' | Report | McMillan 17' (o.g.) | Stadium: Olympic Village; Attendance: 3,000; Referee: Chris Bambridge |

| 4 July 1982 21 | Marconi Fairfield | 3–1 | St George-Budapest | Sydney |
| | Mariani 17'; Sharne 20'; Licata 74' | Report | Barton 80' | Stadium: Marconi Stadium; Attendance: 2,681; Referee: Richard Lorenc |

| 11 July 1982 22 | Adelaide City | 0–0 | Marconi Fairfield | Adelaide |
| | | Report | | Stadium: Olympic Sports Field; Attendance: 2,600; Referee: Don Campbell |

| 18 July 1982 23 | Sydney Olympic | 1–2 | Marconi Fairfield | Sydney |
| | Koussas 47' | Report | Hunter 42'; Jankovics ?' | Stadium: Pratten Park; Attendance: 5,657; Referee: Jim Reeves |

| 25 July 1982 24 | Marconi Fairfield | 1–1 | Brisbane Lions | Sydney |
| | Sharne 52' | Report | Hogg 34' | Stadium: Marconi Stadium; Attendance: 2,119; Referee: Gary Power |

| 1 August 1982 25 | Preston Makedonia | 4–1 | Marconi Fairfield | Melbourne |
| | Ward 3', 12'; McMillan 52'; Calderan 59' (o.g.) | Report | Jankovics 59' | Stadium: B.T. Connor Reserve; Attendance: 1,500; Referee: Evan Venios |

| 8 August 1982 26 | Marconi Fairfield | 1–2 | Wollongong City | Sydney |
| | Jankovics ?' | Report | Tredinnick 12'; Cotton 49' | Stadium: Marconi Stadium; Attendance: 2,034; Referee: Ken Allen |

| 15 August 1982 27 | South Melbourne | 3–1 | Marconi Fairfield | Melbourne |
| | Campbell 9'; Buljevic 62'; Nicolaidis 68' | Report | Licata 78' | Stadium: Middle Park Soccer Stadium; Attendance: 2,500; Referee: Bill Monteverde |

| 22 August 1982 28 | Marconi Fairfield | 1–2 | Sydney City | Sydney |
| | Silva 81' | Report | Kosmina 20'; Boden 73' | Stadium: Marconi Stadium; Attendance: 3,046; Referee: Peter Rampley |

| 29 August 1982 29 | West Adelaide | 0–1 | Marconi Fairfield | Adelaide |
| | | Report | Djordjevic 9' | Stadium: Hindmarsh Stadium; Attendance: 2,500; Referee: Don Campbell |

| 5 September 1982 30 | Marconi Fairfield | 3–1 | Newcastle KB United | Sydney |
| | Henderson 72'; Licata 80'; Jankovics 82' | Report | Hamilton 41' | Stadium: Marconi Stadium; Attendance: 1,880; Referee: Tony Boskovic |

=== NSL Cup ===
| 14 June 1982 First round | Newcastle KB United | 2–2 (a.e.t.) (4–5 p) | Marconi Fairfield | Gosford |
| | Lowe 10', 30' | Report | Silva ?', ?' | Stadium: Grahame Park; Attendance: 2,876 |

| 14 July 1982 Quarter-finals | Marconi Fairfield | 1–2 | APIA Leichhardt | Sydney |
| | Jankovics 75' | Report | Jones 80', 89' | Stadium: Marconi Stadium; Attendance: 1,055; Referee: Tim Davies |

== Statistics ==
=== Appearances and goals ===
Includes all competitions. Players with no appearances not included in the list.

| No. | Pos | Nat | Player | Total | | National Soccer League | | NSL Cup | |
| No. | Pos | Nat | Player | Apps | Goals | Apps | Goals | Apps | Goals |
|---|---|---|---|---|---|---|---|---|---|
| 1 | GK | (Australia) AUS | Allan Maher | 29 | 0 | 27 | 0 | 2 | 0 |
| 2 | DF | (Australia) AUS | Vic Bozanic | 29 | 5 | 26+1 | 5 | 2 | 0 |
| 3 | DF | (Australia) AUS | Ricky Budini | 26 | 0 | 25 | 0 | 1 | 0 |
| 4 | DF | (Australia) AUS | Tony Henderson | 27 | 3 | 24+1 | 3 | 2 | 0 |
| 5 | DF | (Australia) AUS | Ivo Prskalo | 30 | 0 | 29 | 0 | 1 | 0 |
| 6 | DF | (Australia) AUS | Steve Calderan | 27 | 2 | 26+1 | 2 | 0 | 0 |
| 7 | FW | (Socialist Federal Republic of Yugoslavia) YUG | Jovan Djordjevic | 7 | 0 | 4+3 | 0 | 0 | 0 |
| 8 | MF | (Australia) AUS | Attilio Carbone | 5 | 0 | 3+2 | 0 | 0 | 0 |
| 9 | FW | (Italy) ITA | Roberto Vieri | 22 | 1 | 19+2 | 1 | 1 | 0 |
| 10 | GK | (Australia) AUS | Dennis Colusso | 2 | 0 | 2 | 0 | 0 | 0 |
| 11 | MF | (Australia) AUS | Rene Licata | 30 | 7 | 22+6 | 7 | 1+1 | 0 |
| 12 | FW | (Brazil) BRA | Hilton Silva | 27 | 4 | 25 | 2 | 1+1 | 2 |
| 13 | FW | (Australia) AUS | Berti Mariani | 12 | 1 | 8+2 | 1 | 2 | 0 |
| 14 | FW | (Australia) AUS | Mark Jankovics | 24 | 13 | 22 | 12 | 2 | 1 |
| 15 | DF | (Australia) AUS | Tom McCulloch | 11 | 1 | 9+1 | 1 | 1 | 0 |
| 16 | MF | (Australia) AUS | Josip Picioane | 7 | 0 | 5+2 | 0 | 0 | 0 |
| 17 | FW | (Australia) AUS | Ian Hunter | 30 | 6 | 27+2 | 6 | 1 | 0 |
| 18 | | (Australia) AUS | Nikola Duvnjak | 11 | 0 | 10+1 | 0 | 0 | 0 |
| 20 | GK | (Australia) AUS | Tony Veneri | 3 | 0 | 3 | 0 | 0 | 0 |
| | DF | (Australia) AUS | Paul Degney | 7 | 0 | 6 | 0 | 1 | 0 |
| | MF | (Socialist Federal Republic of Yugoslavia) YUG | Dubravko Ledic | 2 | 0 | 2 | 0 | 0 | 0 |
| | DF | (Australia) AUS | Joe Rizzotto | 2 | 0 | 1+1 | 0 | 0 | 0 |
| | FW | (Australia) AUS | Peter Sharne | 4 | 2 | 4 | 2 | 0 | 0 |
| | MF | (Australia) AUS | Marcos Silva | 5 | 0 | 3+2 | 0 | 0 | 0 |

=== Disciplinary record ===
Includes all competitions. The list is sorted by squad number when total cards are equal. Players with no cards not included in the list.

| No. | Pos | Nat | Player | Total | | | National Soccer League | | | NSL Cup | | |
| No. | Pos | Nat | Player | Yellow card | Second yellow card | Red card | Yellow card | Second yellow card | Red card | Yellow card | Second yellow card | Red card |
|---|---|---|---|---|---|---|---|---|---|---|---|---|
| 2 | DF | (Australia) AUS | Vic Bozanic | 4 | 0 | 1 | 4 | 0 | 1 | 0 | 0 | 0 |
| 14 | FW | (Australia) AUS | Mark Jankovics | 3 | 0 | 1 | 3 | 0 | 1 | 0 | 0 | 0 |
| 4 | DF | (Australia) AUS | Tony Henderson | 5 | 0 | 0 | 5 | 0 | 0 | 0 | 0 | 0 |
| 3 | DF | (Australia) AUS | Ricky Budini | 2 | 0 | 0 | 2 | 0 | 0 | 0 | 0 | 0 |
| 5 | DF | (Australia) AUS | Ivo Prskalo | 2 | 0 | 0 | 2 | 0 | 0 | 0 | 0 | 0 |
| 6 | DF | (Australia) AUS | Steve Calderan | 2 | 0 | 0 | 2 | 0 | 0 | 0 | 0 | 0 |
| 18 | | (Australia) AUS | Nikola Duvnjak | 2 | 0 | 0 | 2 | 0 | 0 | 0 | 0 | 0 |
| | MF | (Socialist Federal Republic of Yugoslavia) YUG | Dubravko Ledic | 2 | 0 | 0 | 2 | 0 | 0 | 0 | 0 | 0 |
| 9 | FW | (Italy) ITA | Roberto Vieri | 1 | 0 | 0 | 1 | 0 | 0 | 0 | 0 | 0 |
| 12 | MF | (Australia) AUS | Marcos Silva | 1 | 0 | 0 | 1 | 0 | 0 | 0 | 0 | 0 |

- (yellow card) = Number of bookings; (second yellow card) = Number of sending offs after a second yellow card; (red card) = Number of sending offs by a direct red card.
