= Charity Shield =

Charity Shield may refer to:

- Charity Shield (NSL), former annual super cup in Australia
- Charity Shield (NRL), awarded in an annual National Rugby League match
- FA Charity Shield, previous name of the FA Community Shield
- Rugby League Charity Shield (Great Britain)
- Irish FA Charity Shield
- Malaysian Charity Shield, or Sultan Haji Ahmad Shah Cup
- Maldivian FA Charity Shield
- Singapore Charity Shield
- Sheriff of London Charity Shield
- Surrey Charity Shield
- Trinidad and Tobago Charity Shield
