= 1981 Charity Shield (NSL) =

Association football championship match

Sydney City	Marconi Fairfield
1	3
- Date: 30 January 1981
- Venue: Redfern Oval, Sydney
- Referee: Henry Witschge
- Attendance: 3,500

The 1981 Charity Shield was the first Charity Shield (NSL), a soccer match played between the winners of the previous season's National Soccer League champion and NSL Cup winner. It took place at Redfern Oval on 30 January 1981, between Sydney City and Marconi Fairfield. Marconi Fairfield won 3–1 after extra time, winning the first Charity Shield.

== Background ==
Sydney City qualified for the 1981 Charity Shield as champions of the 1980 National Soccer League. Marconi Fairfield qualified for the 1981 Charity Shield as 1980 NSL Cup winners.

== Match ==
=== Summary ===
Sydney City scored first through John Kosmina in his debut match with the club. Towards the dying seconds of the 90 minutes, Jimmy Cant headed into his own goal for Marconi Fairield to equalize and send the game to extra time. Brazilian forward Nelio Borges was sent off in extra time, with Sydney City to struggle with ten men. Peter Sharne scored two further goals to win the match for Marconi Fairfield.

=== Details ===
30 January 1981

Sydney City	1–3 (a.e.t.)	Marconi Fairfield
Kosmina (?)	Report	Cant 90' (o.g.); Sharne (?)

Redfern Oval, Sydney
Attendance: 3,500
Referee: Henry Witschge

GK	20	(Australia) Tony Pezzano
DF	18	(Australia) Ian Souness
DF	5	(Scotland) Ian Bruce
DF	14	(Costa Rica) Gerry Gomez
DF	12	(Australia) Jimmy Cant
MF	9	(Australia) Ken Boden
MF	8	(Australia) Murray Barnes
MF	3	(Australia) John Spanos
FW	7	(Australia) Joe Watson
FW	10	(Australia) John Kosmina
FW	6	(Australia) Willie Murray
Head Coach:
(Australia) Eddie Thomson

GK	1	(Australia) Allan Maher
DF	2	(Australia) Peter Brogan
DF	13	(Australia) Jim Muir
DF	4	(Australia) Tony Henderson
DF	5	(Australia) Ivo Prskalo
DF	16	(Australia) Drago Tomasich
MF	6	(Australia) Gary Byrne (c)
MF	7	(Australia) Peter Raskopoulos	Substituted off
FW	10	(Australia) Berti Mariani
FW	9	(Australia) Eddie Krncevic	Substituted off
FW	11	(Australia) Peter Sharne
Substitutes:
DF	—	(Australia) Dennis Colusso	Substituted on
MF	15	(Australia) Ken Lindsay	Substituted on
Head Coach:
(Australia) Raul Blanco
