= List of soccer clubs in Australia by competitive honours won =

The page lists Australian association football clubs whose men's sides have won competitive honours run by official governing bodies. Friendly competitions and matches organized between clubs are not included. The football associations FIFA, AFC and OFC run international, Asian and Oceania competitions; while Football Australia, and its mostly self-governing subsidiary bodies the National Soccer League and A-League Men, run national competitions.

== Summary totals ==
Numbers in bold are record totals for that category. Clubs in italics are Double winners: they have won two or more of these trophies in the same season (excluding super cups). Clubs tied in total honours are listed chronologically by most recent honour won. See the other tables for breakdowns of each competition won.

Cups here are competitions with a knockout format. Among FIFA, AFC and OFC competitions, these are the AFC Champions League, the AFC Cup, the OFC Champions League, the Oceania Cup Winners' Cup, the FIFA Club World Cup, and the Pan-Pacific Championship. Among top-qualifying competitions overseen by FA, these are the Australia Cup, the Australia Cup (1962–1968), NSL Cup and the A-League Pre-Season Challenge Cup. Super cups here consist of the honours that have or had only two participating clubs per season. These are the Oceania Cup Winners' Cup and Charity Shield.

Last updated on 8 February 2026.

Combined totals of Australian men's clubs
	FIFA, AFC and OFC			FA, NSL and ALM (top-qualifying)					Total				
Club	Cups	Super cups	Total	Premiers	Champions	Cups	Super cups	Total	Premiers	Champions	Cups	Super cups	Total
Sydney FC	**1**	—	**1**	**4**	**5**	3	—	**12**	4	**5**	4	—	**13**
Hakoah Sydney City East	—	**1**	**1**	2	4	3	**1**	10	2	4	3	**2**	11
South Melbourne	**1**	—	**1**	3	4	2	—	9	3	4	3	—	10
Melbourne Victory	—	—	—	3	4	3	—	10	3	4	3	—	10
Marconi Stallions	—	—	—	3	4	1	**1**	9	3	4	1	1	9
Central Coast Mariners	**1**	—	**1**	3	3	1	—	7	3	3	2	—	8
Adelaide United	—	—	—	2	1	**5**	—	8	2	1	**5**	—	8
Adelaide City	**1**	—	**1**	—	3	3	—	6	—	3	4	—	7
Melbourne Knights	—	—	—	4	2	1	—	7	4	2	1	—	7
Perth Glory	—	—	—	4	2	—	—	6	4	2	—	—	6
Melbourne City	—	—	—	3	2	1	—	6	3	2	1	—	6
Brisbane Roar	—	—	—	2	3	—	—	5	2	3	—	—	5
Sydney Olympic	—	—	—	1	2	2	—	5	1	2	2	—	5
Wollongong Wolves	**1**	—	**1**	1	2	—	—	3	1	2	1	—	4
APIA Leichhardt	—	—	—	—	1	3	—	4	—	1	3	—	4
Sydney United 58	—	—	—	3	—	1	—	4	3	—	1	—	4
Western Sydney Wanderers	**1**	—	**1**	1	—	—	—	1	1	—	1	—	2
Newcastle Jets	—	—	—	—	1	1	—	2	—	1	1	—	2
Brisbane City	—	—	—	—	—	2	—	2	—	—	2	—	2
Macarthur FC	—	—	—	—	—	2	—	2	—	—	2	—	2
Parramatta	—	—	—	—	—	2	—	2	—	—	2	—	2
Brisbane Strikers	—	—	—	—	1	—	—	1	—	1	—	—	1
Brunswick Zebras	—	—	—	—	1	—	—	1	—	1	—	—	1
St George	—	—	—	—	1	—	—	1	—	1	—	—	1
West Adelaide	—	—	—	—	1	—	—	1	—	1	—	—	1
Western United	—	—	—	—	1	—	—	1	—	1	—	—	1
Auckland FC	—	—	—	1	—	—	—	1	1	—	—	—	1
Adamstown Rosebud	—	—	—	—	—	1	—	1	—	—	1	—	1
Caroline Springs George Cross	—	—	—	—	—	1	—	1	—	—	1	—	1
Collingwood Warriors	—	—	—	—	—	1	—	1	—	—	1	—	1
Heidelberg United	—	—	—	—	—	1	—	1	—	—	1	—	1
Melbourne Hungaria	—	—	—	—	—	1	—	1	—	—	1	—	1
Slavia Melbourne	—	—	—	—	—	1	—	1	—	—	1	—	1
Queensland Lions	—	—	—	—	—	1	—	1	—	—	1	—	1
Yugal	—	—	—	—	—	1	—	1	—	—	1	—	1

== FIFA, AFC and OFC ==
ACLE
AFC Champions League Elite. Since 1967. Known as the Asian Club Championship.
OMCL
OFC Men's Champions League. Since 1987. Known as the Oceania Club Championship
OPL
OFC Professional League. Since 2026.
ACL2
AFC Champions League Two. Since 2004. Known as the AFC Cup.
OCWC
Oceania Cup Winners' Cup. Discontinued. Held in 1987.
PPC
Pan-Pacific Championship. Discontinued. Held from 2007 until 2009.
FCWC
FIFA Club World Cup. Since 2000.

Winners of each competition are referenced above. Numbers in bold are Australian record totals for that competition. Trophies that were shared between two clubs are counted as honours for both teams.

Australian men's clubs by FIFA, AFC and OFC honours won
Club	ACLE	OMCL	OPL	ACL2	OCWC	PPC	FCWC	Total
Western Sydney Wanderers	**1**	—	—	—	—	—	—	1
Adelaide City	—	**1**	—	—	—	—	—	1
South Melbourne	—	**1**	—	—	—	—	—	1
Sydney FC	—	**1**	—	—	—	—	—	1
Wollongong Wolves	—	**1**	—	—	—	—	—	1
Central Coast Mariners	—	—	—	**1**	—	—	—	1
Hakoah Sydney City East	—	—	—	—	**1**	—	—	1

== FA, NSL and ALM (top-qualifying) ==
This section only lists competitions overseen by The FA (and its subsidiary leagues the NSL and A-League Men) where there are no higher competitions clubs could participate in instead. See the next section for other competitions run by these bodies.

ASC
Australian soccer champions.
ASP
Australian soccer Premiers.
AUC
Australia Cup. The current national cup since 2014.
AUC60s
Australia Cup (1962–1968). Discontinued. Held from 1962 to 1968.
NSLC
NSL Cup. Discontinued. Held from 1977 to 1997.
ALPCC
A-League Pre-season Challenge Cup. Discontinued. Held from 2005 to 2008.
CS
Charity Shield. Discontinued. Held from 1981 to 1982.

Winners of each competition are referenced above. Numbers in bold are record totals for that competition. Clubs in italics are Double winners: they have won two or more of the top division and the Australia Cup, in the same season.

Last updated on 8 February 2026.

Men's clubs by top-qualifying FA, NSL and ALM competitions won
Club	ASC	ASP	AUC	AUC60s	NSLC	ALPCC	CS	Total
Sydney FC	**5**	**4**	2	—	—	1	—	**12**
Melbourne Victory	4	3	2	—	—	1	—	10
Hakoah Sydney City East	4	2	—	**2**	1	—	**1**	10
South Melbourne	4	3	—	—	2	—	—	9
Marconi Stallions	4	3	—	—	1	—	**1**	9
Adelaide United	1	2	**3**	—	—	**2**	—	8
Central Coast Mariners	3	3	—	—	—	1	—	7
Melbourne Knights	2	**4**	—	—	1	—	—	7
Adelaide City	3	—	—	—	**3**	—	—	6
Perth Glory	2	**4**	—	—	—	—	—	6
Melbourne City	2	3	1	—	—	—	—	6
Brisbane Roar	3	2	—	—	—	—	—	5
Sydney Olympic	2	1	—	—	2	—	—	5
APIA Leichhardt	1	—	—	1	2	—	—	4
Sydney United 58	—	3	—	—	1	—	—	4
Wollongong Wolves	2	1	—	—	—	—	—	3
Newcastle Jets	1	—	1	—	—	—	—	2
Macarthur FC	—	—	2	—	—	—	—	2
Brisbane City	—	—	—	—	2	—	—	2
Parramatta	—	—	—	—	2	—	—	2
Brisbane Strikers	1	—	—	—	—	—	—	1
Brunswick Zebras	1	—	—	—	—	—	—	1
St George	1	—	—	—	—	—	—	1
West Adelaide	1	—	—	—	—	—	—	1
Western United	1	—	—	—	—	—	—	1
Auckland FC	—	1	—	—	—	—	—	1
Western Sydney Wanderers	—	1	—	—	—	—	—	1
Caroline Springs George Cross	—	—	—	1	—	—	—	1
Melbourne Hungaria	—	—	—	1	—	—	—	1
Slavia Melbourne	—	—	—	1	—	—	—	1
Yugal	—	—	—	1	—	—	—	1
Adamstown Rosebud	—	—	—	—	1	—	—	1
Collingwood Warriors	—	—	—	—	1	—	—	1
Heidelberg United	—	—	—	—	1	—	—	1
Queensland Lions	—	—	—	—	1	—	—	1

== See also ==
- List of football clubs by competitive honours won
- List of Australian soccer champions
