= List of Melbourne Victory FC (women) records and statistics =

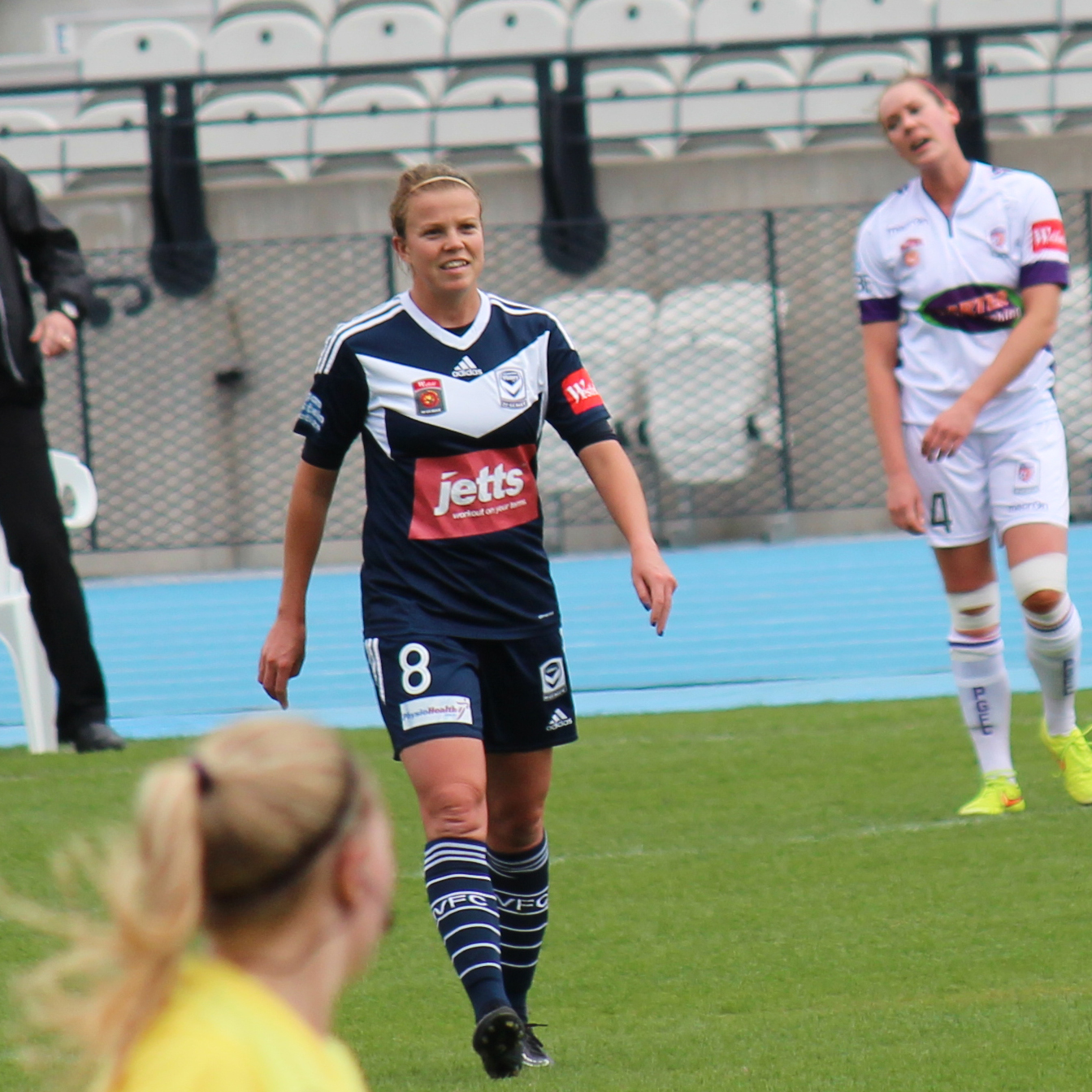
Amy Jackson has made the most appearances for Melbourne Victory (women).

Melbourne Victory Football Club (women) is a women's soccer club based in Swan Street, Melbourne. The club was formed in 2008 as a founding member of the W-League (now A-League Women). The list encompasses the honours won by Melbourne Victory, records set by the club, and their players. The player records section itemises the club's leading goalscorers and those who have made most appearances in first-team competitions. Attendance records are also included.

All figures are correct as of 13 December 2025.

== Honours ==
- A-League Women Premiership

Winners (1): 2018–19
Runners-up (3): 2014, 2019–20, 2024–25

- A-League Women Championship

Winners (3): 2013–14, 2021, 2022
Runners-up (2): 2013, 2025

== Player records ==
=== Appearances ===
- Most appearances: Amy Jackson, 103
- Youngest player: MelindaJ Barbieri, 15 years, 154 days (against Perth Glory, W-League, 17 October 2015)
- Oldest player: Lisa De Vanna, 36 years, 148 days (against Sydney FC, A-League Women Grand Final, 11 April 2021)
- Most consecutive appearances: Kayla Morrison, 71 (from 19 November 2022 to 9 November 2025)

==== Most appearances ====
Competitive matches only, includes appearances as substitute. Numbers in brackets indicate goals scored.

Rank	Player	Years	A-League Women		AWCC	IWCC	Total
Rank	Player	Years	Regular	Finals	AWCC	IWCC	Total
1	(Australia) Amy Jackson	2010–2013; 2014–2015; 2019–2023	89 (14)	10 (1)	3 (0)	1 (0)	103 (15)
2	(Australia) Lia Privitelli	2016–2022; 2022–2025	88 (6)	8 (2)	2 (0)	0 (0)	98 (8)
3	(Australia) Kayla Morrison	2020–2023; 2023–	83 (13)	8 (0)	0 (0)	0 (0)	91 (13)
4	(Australia) Claudia Bunge	2020–2023; 2024–	66 (5)	10 (4)	0 (0)	0 (0)	76 (9)
5	(Australia) Alana Murphy	2021–2025	67 (4)	8 (0)	0 (0)	0 (0)	75 (4)
6	(Australia) Casey Dumont	2017–2023	64 (0)	7 (0)	2 (0)	0 (0)	73 (0)
7	(Australia) Melina Ayres	2017–2023	61 (20)	9 (8)	0 (0)	0 (0)	68 (28)
8	(Turkey) Gülcan Koca	2009–2018	61 (2)	5 (0)	0 (0)	1 (0)	67 (2)
9	(Australia) MelindaJ Barbieri	2015–2022	63 (4)	3 (0)	0 (0)	0 (0)	66 (4)
9	(Australia) Alex Chidiac	2023–2025	59 (12)	7 (0)	0 (0)	0 (0)	66 (12)
9	(Australia) Steph Catley	2009–2014	58 (11)	7 (1)	0 (0)	1 (0)	66 (12)

=== Goalscorers ===
- Top goalscorer: Natasha Dowie, 33
- Youngest goalscorer: MelindaJ Barbieri, 15 years, 210 days (against Western Sydney Wanderers, W-League, 12 December 2015)
- Oldest goalscorer: Lisa De Vanna, 36 years, 141 days (against Brisbane Roar, A-League Women Finals, 4 April 2021)
- Most consecutive goalscoring appearances: Rachel Lowe, 5 (from 6 January 2024 to 3 February 2024)

==== Top goalscorers ====
Competitive matches only. Numbers in brackets indicate appearances made.

Rank	Player	Years	A-League Women		AWCC	IWCC	Total
Rank	Player	Years	Regular	Finals	AWCC	IWCC	Total
1	(Australia) Natasha Dowie	2015; 2016–2017; 2017–2018; 2018–2020	33 (55)	0 (2)	0 (2)	0 (0)	33 (59)
2	(Australia) Melina Ayres	2017–2023	20 (61)	8 (9)	0 (0)	0 (0)	28 (68)
3	(Australia) Emily Gielnik	2018–2019; 2023–2025	23 (44)	1 (4)	0 (0)	0 (0)	24 (48)
4	(Australia) Rachel Lowe	2023–	15 (52)	2 (4)	0 (0)	0 (0)	17 (56)
5	(Australia) Caitlin Friend	2009–2014; 2016–2023	15 (42)	0 (4)	0 (0)	0 (0)	15 (46)
5	(Australia) Amy Jackson	2010–2013; 2014–2015; 2019–2023	14 (89)	1 (10)	0 (3)	0 (1)	15 (103)
7	(Australia) Lisa De Vanna	2013–2014; 2014–2015; 2020–2021	11 (33)	3 (4)	0 (0)	0 (1)	14 (38)
7	(Australia) Catherine Zimmerman	2013–2014; 2014–2015; 2020–2021	12 (32)	2 (7)	0 (0)	0 (0)	14 (39)
9	(Australia) Kayla Morrison	2020–2023; 2023–	13 (83)	0 (8)	0 (0)	0 (0)	13 (91)
10	(Australia) Alex Chidiac	2023–2025	12 (59)	0 (7)	0 (0)	0 (0)	12 (66)
10	(England) Jodie Taylor	2010–2012	12 (19)	0 (2)	0 (0)	0 (0)	12 (21)

== Club records ==
=== Matches ===
- First match: Melbourne Victory 2–0 Central Coast Mariners, W-League, 25 October 2008
- First overseas match: Okayama Yunogo Belle 5–0 Melbourne Victory, International Women's Club Championship, 30 November 2014
- First continental match: Melbourne Victory 0–4 Incheon Hyundai Steel Red Angels, AFC Women's Club Championship, 26 November 2019
- Record win: 7–0 against Newcastle Jets, W-League, 23 February 2020
- Record defeat: 0–6 against Brisbane Roar, A-League Women, 22 January 2021
- Record consecutive wins: 10, from 16 February 2025 to 10 May 2025
- Record consecutive defeats: 7, from 30 November 2014 to 15 November 2015
- Record consecutive matches without a defeat: 15, 11 January 2025 to 10 May 2025
- Record consecutive matches without a win: 9, 10 January 2016 to 28 December 2016
- Record consecutive matches without conceding a goal: 4, 16 January 2022 to 12 February 2022
- Record consecutive matches without scoring a goal: 3, 21 January 2012 to 27 October 2012

=== Goals ===
- Most league goals scored in a season: 44 in 22 matches, 2023–24
- Fewest league goals scored in a season: 9 in 10 matches, 2009
- Most league goals conceded in a season: 29 in 22 matches, 2023–24
- Fewest league goals conceded in a season: 9 in 10 matches, 2011–12

=== Points ===
- Most points in a season: 53 in 23 matches, 2024–25
- Fewest points in a season: 7 in 12 matches, 2015–16

=== Attendances ===
- Highest home attendance: 8,838, against Adelaide United, A-League Women, 26 February 2023
- Lowest home attendance: 264, against Perth Glory, W-League, 4 December 2016

== See also ==
- Soccer records and statistics in Australia
- A-League Women records and statistics
