= 1981 in Australian soccer =

Soccer in Australia
- Season: 1981

Men's soccer
- National Soccer League: Sydney City
- NSL Cup: Brisbane Lions
- Charity Shield: Marconi Fairfield

The 1981 season was the twelfth season of national competitive soccer in Australia and 98th overall.

== National teams ==
=== Australia men's national soccer team ===
==== Results and fixtures ====
===== Group 1 =====
Pos	Team	Pld	W	D	L	GF	GA	GD	Pts	Qualification	New Zealand	Australia	Indonesia	Chinese Taipei for Olympic games	Fiji
1	New Zealand	8	6	2	0	31	3	+28	14	Advance to Final round	—	3–3	5–0	2–0	13–0
2	Australia	8	4	2	2	22	9	+13	10		0–2	—	2–0	3–2	10–0
3	Indonesia	8	2	2	4	5	14	−9	6		0–2	1–0	—	1–0	3–3
4	Chinese Taipei	8	1	3	4	5	8	−3	5		0–0	0–0	2–0	—	0–0
5	Fiji	8	1	3	4	6	35	−29	5		0–4	1–4	0–0	2–1	—

Source: RSSSF

25 April 1981	New Zealand	3–3	Australia	Auckland, New Zealand
	G. Turner 25'; Woodin 34'; Sumner 80'	Report	Krncevic 15', 42'; Boden 31'	Stadium: Mount Smart Stadium; Attendance: 10,000; Referee: Gianfranco Menegali (Italy)

16 May 1981	Australia	0–2	New Zealand	Sydney, Australia
		Report	Woodin 29'; G. Turner 81'	Stadium: Sydney Cricket Ground; Attendance: 12,000; Referee: George Courtney (England)

20 May 1981	Australia	2–0	Indonesia	Melbourne, Australia
	Kosmina 29'; Davidson 33'	Report		Stadium: Olympic Park Stadium; Attendance: 10,000; Referee: V. Garcia Olivera (Portugal)

10 June 1981	Australia	3–2	Chinese Taipei	Adelaide, Australia
	Henderson 18'; Kosmina 56'; Byrne 68' (pen.)	Report		Stadium: Hindmarsh Stadium; Attendance: 3,200; Referee: Vijit Getkaen (Thailand)

26 July 1981	Fiji	1–4	Australia	Suva, Fiji
	Vuilanassa 83'	Report	Cole 4', 31'; Barnes 10'; Sharne 28'	Stadium: National Stadium; Attendance: 11,000

14 August 1981	Australia	10–0	Fiji	Melbourne, Australia
	Mitchell 28', 43', 80'; Cole 37', 43', 54', 63', 70', 71', 76'	Report		Stadium: Olympic Park Stadium; Attendance: 3,500; Referee: A. Nobnom (Thailand)

30 August 1981	Indonesia	1–0	Australia	Suribaya, Indonesia
	Risdianto 88'	Report		Attendance: 25,000; Referee: A. Nobnom (Thailand)

6 September 1981	Chinese Taipei	0–0	Australia	Taipei, Taiwan
		Report		Attendance: 7,000; Referee: T. Gurkan (Philippines)

=== Australia women's national soccer team ===
==== Results and fixtures ====
===== Friendlies =====
5 October 1981 Trans-Tasman Cup	New Zealand	1–2	Australia	Manurewa, New Zealand
	Fulham ?'	Report	Porter ?'; Brentnall ?'	Stadium: Gallaher Park; Attendance:

=== Australia men's national under-20 soccer team ===
==== 1981 FIFA World Youth Championship ====
===== Group D =====
Pos	Team	Pld	W	D	L	GF	GA	GD	Pts	Qualification
1	England	3	1	2	0	4	2	+2	4	Advance to knockout stage
2	Australia (H)	3	1	2	0	6	5	+1	4	Advance to knockout stage
3	Argentina	3	1	1	1	3	3	0	3	
4	Cameroon	3	0	1	2	3	6	−3	1	

Source: RSSSF
(H) Hosts

3 October 1981	Australia	2–1	Argentina	Sydney, Australia
15:00 AEST	Koussas 79'; Hunter 89'	Report	Morresi 66'	Stadium: Sydney Sports Ground; Attendance: 15,814; Referee: Alojzy Jarguz (Poland)

5 October 1981	Australia	3–3	Cameroon	Sydney, Australia
15:00 AEST	Mitchell 9'; Koussas 53', 78' (pen.)	Report	Ollé Ollé 17'; Djonkep 35', 52'	Stadium: Sydney Sports Ground; Attendance: 13,797; Referee: Toros Kibritjian (Syria)

8 October 1981	England	1–1	Australia	Sydney, Australia
21:00 AEST	Small 82'	Report	Koussas 7'	Stadium: Sydney Sports Ground; Attendance: 28,932; Referee: Toros Kibritjian (Romania)

===== Knockout stage =====
11 October 1981 QF	West Germany	1–0	Australia	Canberra, Australia
21:00 AEST	Wohlfarth 69'			Stadium: Bruce Stadium; Attendance: 13,780; Referee: Henning Lund-Sørensen (Denmark)

== Domestic soccer ==
=== National Soccer League ===
Pos	Team	Pld	W	D	L	GF	GA	GD	Pts	Relegation
1	Sydney City (C)	30	19	5	6	59	30	+29	43	
2	South Melbourne	30	13	13	4	41	27	+14	39	
3	Brisbane City	30	12	11	7	37	25	+12	35	
4	APIA Leichhardt	30	12	11	7	39	33	+6	35	
5	Canberra City	30	13	7	10	41	32	+9	33	
6	Brisbane Lions	30	11	11	8	41	33	+8	33	
7	Adelaide City	30	13	6	11	46	42	+4	32	
8	Heidelberg United	30	12	7	11	48	40	+8	31	
9	Sydney Olympic	30	11	9	10	46	46	0	31	
10	Newcastle KB United	30	11	8	11	41	41	0	30	
11	Wollongong City	30	8	12	10	35	39	−4	28	
12	Preston Makedonia	30	9	7	14	39	41	−2	25	
13	Footscray JUST	30	9	7	14	32	48	−16	25	
14	Marconi Fairfield	30	9	7	14	23	45	−22	25	
15	Blacktown City (R)	30	6	9	15	32	47	−15	21	Relegated to the 1982 NSW State League
16	West Adelaide	30	5	4	21	26	57	−31	14	

Updated to match(es) played on unknown. Source: rsssf.com
Rules for classification: 1) points; 2) goal difference; 3) number of goals scored.
(C) Champions; (R) Relegated

=== Cup competitions ===
==== NSL Cup ====
===== Final =====
20 September 1981
15:00 AEST

Brisbane Lions	3–1	West Adelaide
Daunt 4'; Ferris 75'; Williamson 87' (pen.)	Report	Topaz 82'

Canberra Stadium, Canberra
Attendance: 6,132
Referee: Chris Bambridge

==== Charity Shield ====
30 January 1981

Sydney City	1–3 (a.e.t.)	Marconi Fairfield
Kosmina ?'	Report	Cant 90' (o.g.); Sharne ?', ?'

Redfern Oval, Sydney
Attendance: 3,500
Referee: Henry Witschge
