= Dubravko Ledić =

Bosnian footballer

Personal information
- Date of birth: 1950 (age 75–76)
- Place of birth: Yugoslavia (now Bosnia and Herzegovina)
- Height: 1.83 m (6 ft 0 in)
- Position: Midfielder

Senior career*
Years	Team	Apps	(Gls)
1968–1982	FK Velež Mostar		
1983	Edmonton Eagles	?	(2)
1983–1984	Tacoma Stars (indoor)	3	(0)
1983–1984	Chicago Sting (indoor)	11	(0)
- Toronto Croatia
- * Club domestic league appearances and goals

Dubravko Ledić (born 1950) is a former Bosnian footballer who played as a midfielder.

== Career ==
He began his career with FK Velež Mostar of the Yugoslav First League, with whom he played for over a decade and played in 11 European matches with the club in the UEFA Cup and UEFA Cup Winners' Cup.

In 1983, he moved to North America and joined Canadian club Edmonton Eagles of the Canadian Professional Soccer League. He scored his first goal on June 5, 1983 against the Calgary Mustangs. He was named league MVP for the 1983 season as Edmonton won the league championship.

Afterwards, he played indoor soccer with the Tacoma Stars and Chicago Sting. He later played for Toronto Croatia.
