= Steve Calderan =

Australian soccer player

Personal information
- Date of birth: 24 April 1963 (age 63)
- Position: Defender

Senior career*
Years	Team	Apps	(Gls)
1981–1993	Marconi	227	(8)

International career
1989	Australia	3	(0)
- * Club domestic league appearances and goals

Steve Calderan (born 24 April 1963) is an Australian former soccer player who played for Marconi in the National Soccer League (NSL) between 1981 and 1993. He played three matches for the Australia national soccer team.

== International career ==
After playing for an Australian team against Malmö FF in February 1989, Calderan made his full international debut for Australia in March 1989. Calderan's three full international caps were all during the OFC second round qualifying for the 1990 FIFA World Cup during March and April 1989.

== Honours ==
Calderan was named a member of Marconi's greatest XI in 2017.
