= Charity Shield (NSL) =

Australian soccer super cup game

- Founded: 1981; 44 years ago
- Abolished: 1982
- Region: Australia
- Teams: 2
- Related competitions: National Soccer League (qualifier); NSL Cup (qualifier)
- Most championships: Marconi Fairfield; Sydney City (1 title each)

The National Soccer League's Charity Shield was Australian soccer's annual match that ran from 1981 to 1982 between the champions of the previous National Soccer League season and NSL Cup.

Net proceeds from the game went to the Variety Club of Australia aiding handicapped and under-privileged children.

== History ==
The NSL's Charity Shield was followed by the English FA Charity Shield (now Community Shield) competition, as the annual match between league champions and cup winners. At the 1981 season, Sydney City and Marconi Fairfield were the first participants to the Charity Shield, played at Redfern Oval on 30 January 1981. Marconi won its first edition, 3–1 in extra time. The next and final edition of the Charity Shield was in Brisbane between Sydney City and Brisbane Lions. Recovering from the previous' editions match, Sydney City won 3–1 to win the final Charity Shield.

== Results ==
30 January 1981

Sydney City	1–3 (a.e.t.)	Marconi Fairfield
Kosmina ?'	Report	Cant 90' (o.g.); Sharne ?', ?'

Redfern Oval, Sydney
Attendance: 3,500
Referee: Henry Witschge

31 January 1982

Sydney City	3–1	Brisbane Lions
Bennett 34' (o.g.); Kosmina 51', 72'	Report	Burns 75'

Richlands Stadium, Brisbane
Attendance: 1,000~
Referee: Dave Nugent
