= Raúl Blanco (footballer, born 1941) =

Argentine football coach (born 1941)

Personal information
- Date of birth: 4 December 1941 (age 84)
- Place of birth: Buenos Aires, Argentina
- Position: Defender

Senior career*
Years	Team	Apps	(Gls)
1962–1966	Arsenal de Sarandí		
1968–1971	Sydney Prague		
1972–1973	Pan-Hellenic		

Managerial career
- 1979–1980: St George Budapest
- 1981: Marconi Stallions
- 1981–1983: Australia Youth Team
- 1984–1985: Parramatta Eagles
- 1992: NSW Team State Coach
- 1992–1995: West Adelaide Hellas
- 1996–1997: Australia
- 1996–2000: Australia U23
- 2002–2003: Marconi Stallions
- 2009–2010: Macarthur Rams
- 2010–2013: New Zealand (assistant)
Medal record
Men's football
Representing Australia (as manager)
OFC Nations Cup
Runner-up	1998
- * Club domestic league appearances and goals

Raúl Blanco (born 4 December 1941) is an Argentine football coach and former player.

Blanco was born in Buenos Aires. He is well known for coaching the Socceroos from March 1998 to June 1999. He was also coaching the Olyroos (Under-23 side) at the same time, and coached them during the 2000 Summer Olympics. Blanco was also employed by New Zealand Football as a technical assistant in their successful campaign to qualify for the 2010 FIFA World Cup in South Africa while coaching Macarthur Rams.

A defender, Blanco played for Argentine club Arsenal de Sarandí between 1962 and 1966, he then immigrated to Australia where he played for Prague F.C. between 1968 and 1971 and Pan-Hellenic between 1972 and 1973.
