= John Kosmina =

Australian soccer player (born 1956)

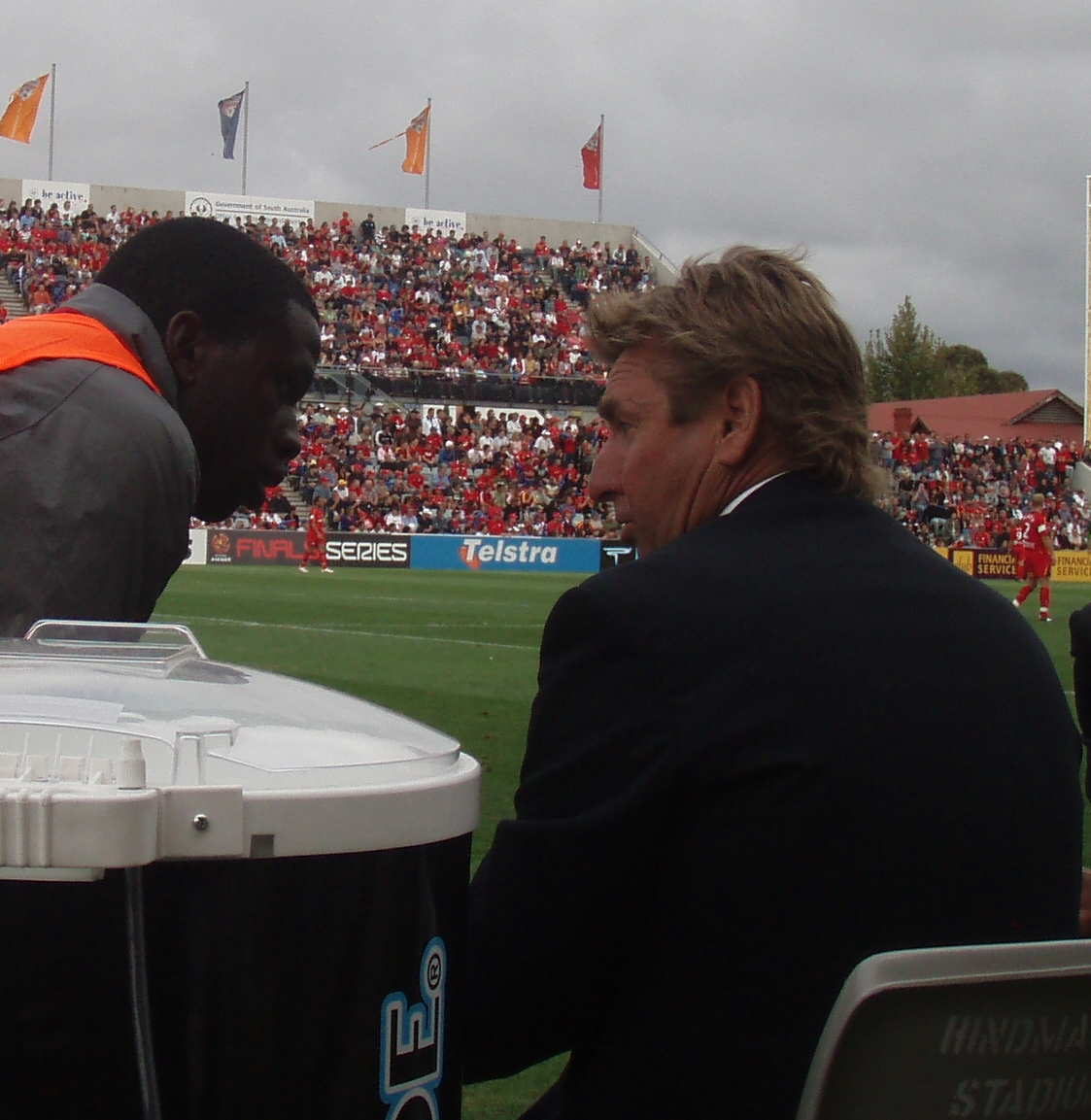

Personal information
- Full name: Alexander John Kosmina
- Date of birth: 17 August 1956 (age 70)
- Place of birth: Adelaide, Australia
- Position: Striker

Youth career
- –1973: Polonia Adelaide

Senior career*
Years	Team	Apps	(Gls)
1973–1976	Polonia Adelaide		
1977	West Adelaide Hellas	23	(12)
1978	Adelaide City	4	(0)
1978–1979	Arsenal	1	(0)
1979–1980	West Adelaide Hellas	44	(12)
1981–1986	Sydney City	150	(89)
1987–1988	Sydney Olympic	44	(13)
1989	APIA Leichhardt	24	(6)
1990	Sutherland Sharks		

International career
1976–1988	Australia	60	(25)

Managerial career
- 1994–1995: Warringah Dolphins
- 1995–1998: Newcastle Breakers
- 1999–2003: Brisbane Strikers
- 2003–2007: Adelaide United
- 2007–2009: Sydney FC
- 2010–2011: Adelaide Raiders
- 2011: Croydon Kings
- 2011–2012: Adelaide United (Caretaker)
- 2012–2013: Adelaide United
- 2016–2019: Brisbane City
- 2020–2021: Brisbane Strikers
- * Club domestic league appearances and goals

Alexander John Kosmina (born 17 August 1956), known as John Kosmina, is an Australian former football (soccer) player and manager, most recently being the Senior Head Coach of Brisbane Strikers. He is a member of the Football Federation Australia Football Hall of Fame.

== Career ==
Kosmina's father was from Poland and came to Australia after World War II. Kosmina's family lived in Port Adelaide, in a heavily Polish community. Kosmina was pushed into football by his father who worked in football.

Kosmina is of Polish Australian ethnicity. He played for Polonia and then West Adelaide. The move offended some people in the community but Kosmina had wanted to play at a higher level. He then played for the English club, Arsenal in February 1978. However, he only played one first-team league game for the Gunners (as a substitute against Leeds United on 19 August 1978), along with 3 appearances (2 as a substitute) in that season's UEFA cup. He was the first Australian to play for Arsenal. He returned to Australia in May 1979 as he said he was feeling homesick and felt like a novelty.

On his return, he went on to become one of the National Soccer League's most prolific scorers, with stints at Adelaide City, West Adelaide (for a second time), Sydney City, Sydney Olympic and A.P.I.A. Leichhardt Tigers before retiring in 1989. The most successful of these was with Sydney City, being part of their 1981 and 1982 championship winning teams, as well as being the league's top scorer in 1982.

Kosmina was captain of the Australian national football team, and helped the team win the Merlion Cup twice. He cited Peter Wilson as a player who had influenced his work as a captain.

During the 1985 season, CR Vasco da Gama toured Australia, playing against various teams in a series of games. Kosmina scored the winning goal in his team's game against Vasco de Gama, which helped Australia win the series and later cited it as one of the best goals he had ever scored.

== Managerial career ==
After retiring, he began coaching the Warringah Dolphins in the New South Wales state leagues, before coaching NSL side Newcastle Breakers, followed by a stint at the Brisbane Strikers. Both stints were largely unsuccessful, his sides reaching the finals only once.

=== Adelaide United ===
In 2003, he became the inaugural coach of Adelaide United. Kosmina coached United to an impressive 3rd in the final season of the NSL. Maintaining his job for the inaugural season of the A-League, Kosmina led his side to the Minor Premiership but a poor finals series saw them finish 3rd overall. The next season saw mixed results for Kosmina and Adelaide United.

Finishing 2nd on the table behind Melbourne Victory, Adelaide managed to reach the grand final, only to be thrashed 6–0. Kosmina's criticism of the refereeing of that match, coupled with the devastating loss and a touchline ban earlier during the season for a scuffle with Victory captain Kevin Muscat, saw him forced to resign by the Adelaide board. Kosmina said that he felt that Muscat had thrown an elbow at him and said he had "lost it".

He was then appointed by Socceroos coach Graham Arnold as his assistant for the 2007 Asian Cup.

=== Sydney FC ===
After the sacking of Branko Culina by the Sydney Football Club Board, Kosmina was confirmed on 24 October 2007 as the new Sydney FC coach. Since signing with Sydney FC Kosmina made an immediate impact; winning his first game with Sydney 3–2 against rivals Central Coast Mariners at the Sydney Football Stadium.

Sydney FC beat the LA Galaxy 5–3 at Sydney's Telstra Stadium in a friendly, and also won a thrilling 5–4 victory against the Central Coast Mariners at Bluetongue Stadium. Following Sydney FC's poor run in the 2008/2009 season (missing the finals for the first time), John Kosmina had his contract terminated in late January 2009.

=== Adelaide Raiders ===
He was announced the manager of the Adelaide Raiders, a semi-professional club playing in the FFSA Super League. On 1 September 2011, it was announced he had signed as senior coach of FFSA Super League club Croydon Kings after more than 35 years away from the club. It was announced on 18 December 2011 that Croydon Kings had agreed to release Kosmina from his coaching contract so he could accept the Adelaide United manager position.

=== Return to Adelaide United ===
On 18 December 2011 he signed as caretaker coach with Adelaide United for the remainder of the 2011–12 A-League season. On 22 March 2012 it was announced he had signed a one-year contract with the club to stay on for the 2012–13 A-League season. On 28 January 2013 he stood down as manager of Adelaide United, citing a lack of trust at the club.

=== Brisbane City ===
In August 2015, Kosmina was appointed senior coach and football leader at National Premier Leagues Queensland club Brisbane City, signing a three-year contract. In November 2018, it was announced that he would join the coaching staff at St Joseph's College, Gregory Terrace, taking responsibility for the Open First and Second XI teams, as well as the Year 10 and 11 teams, as part of a partnership between the college and Brisbane City.

=== Brisbane Strikers ===
In November 2020, Brisbane Strikers announced that Kosmina would return to the club as senior coach, 17 years after he last coached the side. After a string of shocking results Kosmina was sacked by the club on Monday 24 May

On 24 May 2021, it was announced via a club statement on the club website that the Brisbane Strikers and Kosmina would be parting ways. This decision came after a poor run of form which saw the Strikers not take a single point from their first ten games in the 2021 NPL Queensland Season.

== Media ==
He occasionally appears on Fox Sports as a commentator and football analyst. Kosmina co-hosts a weekly Internet television show about football on Australia Live TV with Ross Aloisi, Two Up Front and the episodes are on AustraliaLiveTV.com.

== International goals ==
Scores and results list goal tally first.

No	Date	Venue	Opponent	Score	Result	Competition	Opening Goal
1	27 October 1976	Beijing Workers Stadium	Chinese Selection	3–3	4–5	Friendly Game	No
2	27 October 1976	Beijing Workers Stadium	Chinese Selection	3–4	4–5	Friendly Game	No
3	9 November 1976	Eindhoven, Netherlands	(Netherlands) PSV Eindhoven	2–1	2–1	Friendly Game	No
4	2 February 1977	Olympic Park Stadium	(Socialist Federal Republic of Yugoslavia) Red Star Belgrade	1–3	1–3	Friendly Game	No
5	20 July 1977	Sydney Sports Ground	(England) Arsenal F.C.	1–0	3–1	Friendly Game	Yes
6	28 July 1977	Olympic Park Stadium	(Socialist Federal Republic of Yugoslavia) Red Star Belgrade	1–0	2–3	Friendly Game	Yes
7	16 March 1977	Ba, Fiji	Taiwan	0–1	1–2	1978 FIFA World Cup qualification (AFC and OFC)	No
8	27 March 1977	Sydney Cricket Ground	New Zealand	3–1	3–1	1978 FIFA World Cup qualification (AFC and OFC)	No
9	10 July 1977	Adelaide, Australia	Hong Kong	1–0	3–0	1978 FIFA World Cup qualification (AFC and OFC)	Yes
10	10 July 1977	Adelaide, Australia	Hong Kong	3–0	3–0	1978 FIFA World Cup qualification (AFC and OFC)	No
11	28 August 1977	Sydney Sports Ground	South Korea	1–1	1–2	1978 FIFA World Cup qualification (AFC and OFC)	No
12	28 August 1977	Sydney Sports Ground	South Korea	1–2	1–2	1978 FIFA World Cup qualification (AFC and OFC)	No
13	20 May 1981	Olympic Park Stadium	Indonesia	1–0	2–0	1982 FIFA World Cup qualification (AFC and OFC)	Yes
14	10 June 1981	Hindmarsh Stadium	Taiwan	2–0	3–2	1982 FIFA World Cup qualification (AFC and OFC)	No
15	10 October 1982	Singapore National Stadium	Thailand	0–3	0–4	Friendly Game	No
16	10 October 1982	Singapore National Stadium	Thailand	0–4	0–4	Friendly Game	No
17	15 October 1982	Singapore National Stadium	Malaysia	0–3	0–5	Friendly Game	No
18	26 November 1983	Inglewood, Perth	Western Australia	2–1	2–1	Friendly Game	No
19	30 November 1983	Kuala Lumpur, Malaysia	(Malaysia) Kuala Lumpur FA	1–2	1–4	Friendly Game	No
20	30 November 1983	Kuala Lumpur, Malaysia	(Malaysia) Kuala Lumpur FA	1–3	1–4	Friendly Game	No
21	2 December 1983	Singapore	Singapore	1–1	1–3	Friendly Game	No
22	4 December 1983	Singapore	China	2–1	2–1	Merlion Cup	No
23	10 December 1983	Singapore	Thailand	0–2	0–2	Merlion Cup	No
24	15 December 1983	Singapore	South Korea	0–1	1–3	Merlion Cup	Yes
25	18 December 1983	Singapore	Singapore	2–2	2–4	Merlion Cup	No
26	2 June 1984	Sydney Cricket Ground	(Scotland) Rangers F.C.	2–1	3–2	Friendly Game	No
27	7 June 1984	Lang Park, Brisbane	(England) Nottingham Forest F.C.	1–0	2–2	Friendly Game	Yes
27	21 June 1984	Sydney, Australia	(Greece) Iraklis	1–0	2–0	Friendly Game	Yes
29	14 November 1984	Manchester, England	(England) Manchester City F.C.	1–2	1–3	Friendly Game	No
30	9 May 1985	Melbourne Cricket Ground	(Brazil) Clube de Regatas Vasco da Gama	1–0	2–1	Friendly Game	Yes
31	9 May 1985	Melbourne Cricket Ground	(Brazil) Clube de Regatas Vasco da Gama	2–1	2–1	Friendly Game	No
32	15 September 1985	Middle Park, Melbourne	Victorian All-Stars	0–1	2–3	Friendly Game	Yes
33	15 September 1985	Middle Park, Melbourne	Victorian All-Stars	0–2	2–3	Friendly Game	No

== Honours ==
=== Player ===
Sydney City

- NSL Championship: 1981, 1982
- NSL Cup: 1986

Individual

- FFA Hall of Fame: 1999
- NSL Top Scorer: 1982
- NSL Under 21 Player of the Year: 1977

=== Manager ===
Adelaide United

- A-League Premiership: 2005–2006

Awards and laurels

- Kosmina Street in the Sydney suburb of Glenwood is named for him, along with Kosmina Crescent in the northern Adelaide suburb of Hillbank.
- John Kosmina Medal — The award given to the player of the match in the National Premier Leagues Grand Final each year is named in his honour.
